= Comparison of system dynamics software =

This is a comparison of various aspects of software offering system dynamics features:

Due to concerns over commercial postings on the system dynamics main topic, commercial hyperlinks are specifically NOT active on this list.

== Table of system dynamics software ==
Sortable table
Package name	Licensing	Implementation language	Last update (year)	More info
AMESim	Proprietary, commercial	C	2017	Distributed by Siemens. Modelica-models supported.
Analytica	Proprietary, commercial, free limited version	C++	2018	Supports system dynamics, Monte Carlo simulation for uncertainty, array abstraction for handling multidimensional data, linear and non-linear optimization. Uses influence diagrams to define, navigate, and document models.
AnyLogic	Proprietary, commercial, free Personal Learning Edition (PLE) for education, formal or not	Java	2020	Supports system dynamics, agent based and discrete event modeling, allows making hybrid models.
ASCEND	Free, GNU General Public License (GPL)	C	2012	For solving small to very large mathematical models, systems of non-linear equations, linear and nonlinear optimisation problems, dynamic systems expressed as differential-algebraic equations.
Berkeley Madonna	Proprietary, commercial	C++, Java	2018	Developed on Berkeley campus under sponsorship of NSF and NIH, used by academic and commercial institutions to build mathematical models for research and teaching. Solves ordinary differential equations (initial conditions and boundary value problems), difference equations (initial conditions and boundary value problems), multi-dimensional transcendental algebraic equation roots, discrete simulations using conveyors, ovens, and queues. Suitable for large-scale systems, boundary value problems, Monte Carlo models, curve fitting, root finding, batch processes, parameter plots, stiff systems, etc.
Dymola	Proprietary, commercial	C++ et al.	2024	A modeling and simulation environment based on the Modelica modeling language, also supporting the FMI, eFMI and SSP standards. Uses symbolic equation processing to generate efficient simulation code.
DYNAMO	Proprietary, no longer distributed commercially	AED, Pascal	1986	Historic DYNAMO models are often available at the MIT system dynamics website. DYNAMO software for microcomputers may be available via eBay or other resale sites.
GoldSim	Proprietary, commercial	C++	2022	Differs from traditional system dynamics approaches in that 1) it puts much greater emphasis on probabilistic simulation techniques to support representation of uncertain and/or stochastic systems; and 2) it provides a wide variety of specialized model objects (beyond stocks, flows and converters) in order to make models less abstract (and hence more transparent) and help represent processes and events that cannot easily be represented using a traditional system dynamics approach. These differences are due to the fact that GoldSim is primarily used for engineering and scientific applications where quantitative probabilistic predictions of future performance are required.
iThink	Proprietary, commercial	C++, JavaScript	2018	System dynamics and discrete event modeling with some agent-based capabilities. Drag and drop user interface builder allows simulations to be published online. Includes multilevel hierarchical models, reusable modules, multidimensional arrays, optimization, and Monte Carlo analysis.
LunaSim	Free	JavaScript	2025	Open-source, web-based system dynamics simulation platform designed to make modeling accessible to students and educators anywhere. Provides an online alternative for simulation that can be accessed from any computer with a standard browser.
MapleSim	Proprietary, commercial	Java (GUI), C, Maple (engine)	2017	Modelica-based system-level modeling tool. Leverages symbolic computing via tight integration with Maple.
NetLogo	Free, GPLv2	Java, Scala	2020	Agent-based modeling environment in LOGO; supports system dynamics models as a secondary feature.
OpenModelica	Free, OSMC Public License, Eclipse Public License (EPL), GNU General Public License (GPL)	C, C++, MetaModelica	2024	Modelica-based modeling and simulation environment. Modelica is an object-oriented, declarative, multi-domain modeling language for component-oriented modeling of complex systems. Next to the free System Dynamics library, which is exclusively based on modeling signal flows, there is a free Business Simulation Library (BSL) dedicated to System Dynamics, which makes use of Modelica's acausal connectors to account for transitions of conserved matter.
PathSim	Free, MIT License	Python	2024	Open source dynamical system simulation framework in the block-diagram paradigm. Discrete event handling.
SAAM II	Proprietary, commercial, academic, teaching	Visual interface	2022	Uses compartmental theory to model dynamic systems. Typically used in life science problems like substance/nutrient kinetics and effects or epidemiology.
se-lib	Free, MIT License	Python	2023	Open source Systems Engineering Library (se-lib) provides system dynamics and discrete event simulation.
Silico Dynamic simulation platform	Proprietary, commercial, free to use for public projects	Visual interface	?	Web-based interactive system dynamics modeling platform
Simcad Pro	Proprietary, commercial, free full featured demo	Visual interface	2019	Interactive process simulation software with support for manufacturing, healthcare and supply chain. 2D and 3D visualization with VR capability
Simantics System Dynamics	Free, Eclipse Public License (EPL)	Java, Modelica	2018	Free and open source system dynamics modelling software with stock and flow modelling, hierarchical models and array variables.
Simulink	Proprietary, commercial	?	2019	Tight integration with MATLAB
Stella	Proprietary, commercial, limited free online version	C++, JavaScript	2020	System dynamics and discrete event modeling with some agent-based capabilities. Drag and drop user interface builder in Architect versions allows simulations to be published online. Includes multilevel hierarchical models, reusable modules, multidimensional arrays, optimization, and Monte Carlo analysis.
StochSD	Free, AGPL v3	JavaScript	2022	Stochastic and deterministic modelling and simulation based on the System Dynamics approach to Continuous System Simulation (CSS). Includes tools for optimization/parameter estimation, sensitivity analysis, and statistical analysis and presentation of results from multiple simulations of stochastic models. Based on the InsightMaker-engine, stock and flow models are constructed in a click-and-draw manner. Mainly intended for education and research where small and medium-sized CSS modelling and simulation is used.
Vensim	Proprietary, commercial, free Personal Learning Edition (PLE) for education and personal use	C, C++	2020	Continuous simulation with stocks and flows, some discrete delay and discrete event functionality. Flexible array syntax with mapping among dimensions. Extensive support for time series data import and export, with calibration optimization and Markov chain Monte Carlo for estimation. Monte Carlo and other sensitivity simulation methods. Graphical model construction and interfaces. External functions and compiled simulation.
VisSim	Proprietary, commercial	C	2011	Accredited education institutions are allowed to site license VisSim v3.0 for free. The latest versions, and add-ons, are available to students and academic institutions at reduced pricing. A read-only version of the software, VisSim Viewer is available for free and provides a way for unlicensed users to run VisSim models.
Wolfram SystemModeler	Proprietary, commercial	C++	2020	Supports continuous time and discrete event modeling, external C-functions, component based, hierarchical modeling, and is based on the Modelica modeling language offering a tight integration with Mathematica. Models can be exported to run as standalone applications for users without SystemModeler and the Functional Mock-up Interface can be used for model exchange and co-simulation. Next to the free System Dynamics library, which is exclusively based on modeling signal flows, there is a free Business Simulation Library (BSL) dedicated to System Dynamics, which makes use of Modelica's acausal connectors to account for transitions of conserved matter.

L.The graphing library mxGraph is licensed separately under a paid commercial license. However, it's important to note that its GitHub repository was archived by its owner in 2021 and is now in a read-only state.

== See also ==
- List of computer simulation software
