= SimulationX =

Software application

- Developer: ESI ITI GmbH
- Stable release: 4.3 / January 2022; 4 years ago
- Operating system: Microsoft Windows
- Platform: Intel x86 32-bit, x86-64
- Available in: English and German
- Type: Simulation software
- License: Proprietary commercial software
- Website: SimulationX product page

SimulationX is a CAE software application running on Microsoft Windows for the physical simulation of technical systems. It is developed and sold by ESI Group.

== History ==
In the mid 1980s, VEB Mikromat in Dresden (Germany) developed a program for MS-DOS to design controlled feed axis systems and to perform hydraulic calculations. In 1993, ITI GmbH, founded by former Mikromat employees in 1990, introduced a simulation tool for Microsoft Windows designed for dynamic calculations of drive systems: ITI-SIM 1. With the release of ITI-SIM 2 in 1995, the software also allowed for fluid simulations. In 2002, the newly developed application SimulationX, based on the object-oriented description language Modelica, was introduced to the market. By the year 2007, ITI-SIM (then in version 3.8) had been completely replaced by SimulationX.

Since the beginning of 2016, ITI belongs to the ESI Group and now operates under the name ESI ITI GmbH.

== Modeling and Functionality ==
Simulation models are created on the basis of a discrete network approach. That means the system is broken down into logical parts which are linked through specific connections. These sub-systems are represented by preconfigured or custom model elements organized in domain-specific and custom model libraries. The sub-models are then parameterized and connected with each other. Models can be created either through the graphical user interface or by using Modelica command lines.

== Libraries ==
Model libraries can be obtained as modular packages from the software producer. There are various libraries available with basic models for the corresponding physical domains as well as libraries with advanced models for specific applications and industries. Depending on the objective, the user can choose from 1D, 2D and 3D model elements with respect to the modeling, simulation and parameterization requirements. Modelica-based third-party and custom-built libraries can also be integrated into SimulationX.

SimulationX libraries include:

- Signal blocks: General Signal Blocks, Signal Sources, Linear Signal Blocks, Non-Linear Signal Blocks, Time-Discrete Signal Blocks, Special Signal Blocks, Switches
- Mechanics: Mechanics 1D (rotary, linear), Planar Mechanics, Multibody systems, CAD Import via STL
- Power Transmission: Motors and Engines, Couplings and Clutches, Transmission Elements, Planetary Structures
- Electrical Engineering and Electronics: Electronics (Analog), Magnetics, Electric Motors, Stepping Motors
- Fluid Power and Thermodynamics: Hydraulics (pressure source, tank, volume, differential cylinder, throttle, valves, plunger cylinder, constant and variable), pneumatics (gases and mixtures), Thermal-Fluid (single phase with liquids and gases, two-phase with coolants, refrigerants, NIST, water, wet air, gas mixtures)
- Torsional Vibration Analysis: Inertia, Torques, Dampers, Couplings, Gears, Sensors
- Special: Subsea Library: Subsea Hydraulics, Subsea Electrics, Offshore Handling

== Modelica ==
SimulationX supports the Modelica modeling language to simulate individually created, realistic (sub-)models. Models of the Modelica Standard Library or the ones purely based on the Modelica language definition can be executed.

== Interfaces ==
SimulationX provides open, comprehensive CAx-interfaces to external programs for different purposes and applications, e.g. CAE (VehicleSim (CarSim, BikeSim, TruckSim)), CAD (Solid Edge, Unigraphics / NX, SolidWorks, Creo Elements/Pro, Autodesk Inventor, CATIA V5), CAM, Computer-aided optimization (e.g. Isight, modeFRONTIER, Optimus, optiSLang, OptiY), FEA/FEM (Abaqus, Ansys, COMSOL Multiphysics, MSC Nastran), CFD. Co-Simulation provides a general interface which can be used to link SimulationX to CAE tools with predefined setups for particular realizations (MSC.Adams, SIMPACK, MATLAB/Simulink, Fluent, Cadmould etc.). The coupling ensures the data exchange between the tools and the simulation software. Tools for a holistic structural and system analysis (equilibrium computation, natural frequencies, vibration modes, input-output analysis) and for linking a simulation model to the databases are available. A COM interface allows communication between SimulationX and other Windows applications for user-defined batch runs, embedded simulation, parameter studies, or optimizations.

Code-Export features support the generation of C source code for model integration, Hardware-in-the-loop applications and Rapid Control Prototyping, Functional Mock-up Virtual Machine. Throughout stages of system design processes, engineers and scientists can work with a variety of tools. The connection of SimulationX to real-time testing and simulation platforms such as LabVIEW, NI VeriStand, dSPACE, ETAS LABCAR, and SCALE-RT increases the productivity in the design cycle and shortens time-to-market.

SimulationX supports the creation and import of Functional Mock-up Units defined by the Functional Mock-up Interface standard (development started by the MODELISAR project). Standardized interfaces facilitate the platform-independent exchange of simulation models and increase the flexibility in the connection of external simulation tools and models.

== Industry usage ==
SimulationX is used for designing, modeling and analyzing the dynamic behavior of complex mechatronic systems as well as for virtual tests in many industries, research and education including the automotive sector, railway and shipbuilding, heavy machinery and mining, power generation and building technology, aerospace and defense, mechanical engineering, medical engineering, oil and gas, precision instruments and home appliances as well as consumer electronics.

== Academic usage ==
SimulationX is widely used in education and research worldwide.

== See also ==
- 20-sim
- Dymola
- EcosimPro
- LMS Imagine.Lab Amesim
- Modelica
- MapleSim
- Wolfram SystemModeler
- Simulink
