= MapleSim =

- Modeling and Simulation with MapleSim
- Developer: Maplesoft
- Initial release: December 15, 2008; 17 years ago
- Stable release: 2025.2
- Operating system: Windows 7 or later; macOS 10.12 or later; Red Hat Enterprise Linux 7 or later; SUSE Linux Enterprise 15 or later; Ubuntu 18.04 or later
- Platform: Intel x86 32-bit, x86-64; Maple (software)
- Available in: English, French and Japanese
- Type: Mathematical modeling and Computer Simulation
- License: Proprietary commercial software
- Website: www.maplesoft.com/products/maplesim/index.aspx

MapleSim is a Modelica-based, multi-domain modeling and simulation tool developed by Maplesoft. MapleSim generates model equations, runs simulations, and performs analyses using the symbolic and numeric mathematical engine of Maple. Models are created by dragging-and-dropping components from a library into a central workspace, resulting in a model that represents the physical system in a graphical form. Maplesoft began development of MapleSim partly in response to a request from Toyota to produce physical modeling tools to aid in their new model-based development process.

The MapleSim library includes many components that can be connected together to model a system. These components are from areas of science and engineering such as electrical, mechanical, and thermal engineering fields. MapleSim also includes traditional signal flow components that can be combined with other physical components in the workspace. Thus, MapleSim is able to combine causal modeling methods with acausal techniques that do not require specification of signal flow direction between all components.

The use of Maple underneath MapleSim allows all of the system equations to be generated and simplified automatically. The user can explore their system in various ways, such as viewing the equations behind their model and performing parameter optimization. The use of the Maple mathematics engine also allows for MapleSim to incorporate such features as units management and solving of high-order DAEs that are typically encountered in complex acausal models.

== Release history ==
| Name/Version | Date |
|---|---|
| MapleSim 1.0 | December 2008 |
| MapleSim 2.0 | April 2009 |
| MapleSim 3.0 | October 2009 |
| MapleSim 4.0 | April 2010 |
| MapleSim 4.5 | October 2010 |
| MapleSim 5.0 | June 2011 |
| MapleSim 5.01 | October 2011 |
| MapleSim 5.02 | January 2012 |
| MapleSim 6.0 | September 2012 |
| MapleSim 6.1 | April 2013 |
| MapleSim 6.2 | September 2013 |
| MapleSim 6.3 | December 2013 |
| MapleSim 6.4 | March 2014 |
| MapleSim 7 | December 2014 |
| MapleSim 2015 | May 2015 |
| MapleSim 2016 | April 2016 |
| MapleSim 2016.2 | January 2017 |
| MapleSim 2017.0 | May 2017 |
| MapleSim 2017.1 | June 2017 |
| MapleSim 2017.2 | August 2017 |
| MapleSim 2017.3 | September 2017 |
| MapleSim 2018.1 | June 2018 |
| MapleSim 2019.1 | May 2019 |

== Add-on libraries & tools ==
- MapleSim Connector
  - ANSI C base Simulink S-function code generation
- MapleSim Connector for FMI
  - FMU generation based on FMI Standard
- B&R MapleSim Connector
  - Integration tool for B&R Automation Studio and MapleSim models
- MapleSim Connector for LabVIEW and NI Veristand
  - Code generation for NI LabVIEW Software
- MapleSim Connector for JMAG-RT
  - Import JMAG-RT file into MapleSim model
- MapleSim CAD Toolbox
  - Import various CAD models into MapleSim then automatically recreating the model components in MapleSim
- MapleSim Tire Library
  - Industry standard tire component library which includes Fiala, Calspan and Pacejka 2002 types.
- MapleSim Driveline Library
  - Component library for powertrain modeling in automotive engineering such as differential, wheels and road loads.
- MapleSim Battery Library
  - Supports electrochemical and equivalent-circuit models for battery system modeling
- MapleSim Hydraulics Library from Modelon
  - Third-party version for Hydraulics component models
- MapleSim Pneumatics Library from Modelon
  - Third-party version for Pneumatics component models
- MapleSim Engine Dynamics Library from Modelon
  - Third-party version of Engine Dynamics Library which can be used for modeling and simulation for combustion engine in automotive applications.
- MapleSim Heat Transfer Library from CYBERNET
  - System-level simulation for Heat Transfer effects in MapleSim model based on automatically generated discretization approach.
- MapleSim Control Design Toolbox
  - Provides a set of commands for controller design such as PID working with plant models designed by MapleSim. These commands are used in Maple.
- MapleSim Explorer
  - Viewer version of MapleSim that can run simulation of MapleSim models.
- MapleSim Server
  - Web deployment option that can serve MapleSim models on web browser or tablets.

== See also ==
- AMESim
- APMonitor
- Computer simulation
- Control engineering
- Dymola
- EcosimPro
- EMSO simulator
- Hardware-in-the-loop simulation
- Maple (software)
- Mechatronics
- Model-based design
- Modelica
- SimulationX
- Vehicle dynamics
- Wolfram SystemModeler
