= Computable Document Format =

File format

- Filename extension: .cdf
- Internet media type: application/cdf
- Uniform Type Identifier (UTI): com.wolfram.cdf
- Developed by: Wolfram Research
- Initial release: July 21, 2011
- Extended from: Wolfram Language (notebook)
- Standard: Notebook, CDF
- Open format?: No
- Website: Computable Document Format

Computable Document Format (CDF) is an electronic document format designed to allow authoring dynamically generated, interactive content. CDF was created by Wolfram Research, and CDF files can be created using Mathematica. As of 2021, the Wolfram Research website lists CDF as a "legacy" format; it has been replaced by Wolfram Computational Notebooks.

== Features ==
Computable Document Format supports GUI elements such as sliders, menus, and buttons. Content is updated using embedded computation in response to GUI interaction. Contents can include formatted text, tables, images, sounds, and animations. CDF supports Mathematica typesetting and technical notation. Paginated layout, structured drill down layout, and slideshow mode are supported. Styles can be controlled using a cascading style sheet.

== Reading ==
CDF files can be read using a proprietary CDF Player, downloadable from the Wolfram Research website but with a restricted license. In contrast to static formats such as PDF, the CDF Player contains an entire runtime library of Mathematica allowing document content to be generated in response to user interaction and digital textbooks.

CDF reader support is available for Microsoft Windows, Macintosh, Linux and iOS but not for e-book readers or Android tablets. The reader supports a plugin mode for Internet Explorer, Mozilla Firefox, Google Chrome, Opera and Safari, which allows CDF content to be embedded inline in HTML pages.

== Uses ==
Computable Document Format has been used in electronic books by Pearson Education, specifically MyMathLab, to provide the content for the Wolfram Demonstrations Project, and to add client-side interactivity to Wolfram Alpha.

== See also ==
- List of numerical analysis software
