= MBD =

MBD or MBd may refer to:

== Science and technology ==
=== Biology and medicine ===
- Marchiafava–Bignami disease, a neurological disease associated with alcoholism
- Metabolic bone disease, typically resulting from mineral deficiency
- Methyl-CpG-binding domain protein 2 a protein which bind the DNA on its methyl-CpG
- Minimal brain dysfunction or minimal brain damage, obsolete terms for attention deficit hyperactivity disorder, dyslexia and other learning disabilities

=== Computing ===
- Megabaud (MBd), equal to one million baud, symbol rate in telecommunications
- Model-based definition, a method of using 3D CAD information to provide product specifications
- Model-based design, a mathematical and visual method of addressing problems associated with designing complex control, signal processing and communication systems
- Motherboard, a computer component

=== Physics ===
- Maxwell–Boltzmann distribution, a probability distribution in physics and chemistry
- Multibody dynamics

== Media ==
- Mordechai Ben David, a Jewish singer and recording artist
- Murder by Death (band), an indie rock band
- My Brightest Diamond, chamber rock band of Shara Worden
- Man bites dog (journalism), a shortened version of an aphorism in journalism

== Other uses ==
- IATA code for Mahikeng or Mmabatho Airport in South Africa
- Member Board of Directors
- Microsoft Business Division, responsible for making Microsoft Office
