= Kamilah Taylor =

Jamaican software engineer

Kamilah Taylor is a Jamaican software engineer; she is known for advocating for women and people of color in the tech industry.

== Early life and education ==
Taylor was born in Jamaica, to parents Ashley Hamilton-Taylor and Delta Taylor. Her parents still reside in Jamaica, where her father is a computer science lecturer at University of the West Indies, and her mother is a teacher at St. Andrew's Prep School.

In Taylor's earlier years, she attended Mona Preparatory School in Kingston, Jamaica until the fifth grade. She completed middle school at Holcomb Bridge and attended North Spring Charter high school in Atlanta. Both of which were magnet schools centered around advanced math and sciences, as well as performing arts. She obtained a bachelor's degree in math and computer science from the University of the West Indies. She also earned a master's degree in computer science with a concentration in robotics from the University of Illinois at Urbana-Champaign.

== Career ==
Taylor's career started at Wolfram Research, Inc directly after completing graduate school. In late 2011, she applied to LinkedIn and joined the company in 2012 as a software engineer. Taylor led the infrastructure and flagship app integrations on the LinkedIn Learning app. In 2017, she was noted as one of Business Insider’s most powerful female engineers in the United States for her work with LinkedIn. Taylor was involved via Google chat in the Girls in ICT Caribbean hackathon, which was held in Jamaica, Trinidad, and Barbados — International Girls in ICT Day in 2017.

An engineering manager for Uber tried recruiting Taylor for a developer position at the San Francisco startup. However, she declined the position due to a major sexual harassment controversy with the company. The female manager replied telling her that “sexism is systemic in tech”, which then sparked some backlash via Twitter.

Taylor is a co-author of the book, Women in Tech.
