= Kanguera =

Robot hand

Kanguera is a robot hand developed by the University of São Paulo. It runs the VxWorks operating system. The goal of this research project is to model the kinematic properties of a human hand so that better anthropomorphic robotic grippers or manipulators can be developed. The name, Kanguera, is an ancient indigenous word for "bones outside the body".

== Objectives ==
According to the university's project page, some of the objectives of the Kanguera project are to develop strategies for dexterous robotic manipulation and to create new designs for robotic hands which are biologically inspired. These new designs and strategies will be used for user friendly human machine interface and for upper limb rehabilitation technologies.

== System Description ==
The hand has an anthropomorphic shape, and is the size of a large human hand. It has 4 fingers, and a simplified thumb, each one with four degrees of freedom (DOF). Each finger is treated as an individual robot, giving the overall system, from the wrist on, 20 DOF in total. The fingers are constructed from a special resin, and the joints are designed to mimic human joints - they are not physically joined, but in close contact, using the resin's friction and cables to work together. The motion of each DOF driven through a servo, and a cable transmission system. This transmission system is more accurate than the ones uses by previous robotic hands, and is thus more suitable for the implementation of complex trajectory algorithms, such as adduction and abduction capacity for both the fingers and the thumb.

The computational hardware is based on a GE FANUC microcontroller with a G4 processor, mounted on a standard compact PCI bus. The operating system used to run the simulations is VxWorks 6.7, and the simulation environment is handled with GraspIt! software, where a model of the hand was developed in order to visualize it.

== Development ==
The hand was developed by the Mechatronics Laboratory at the School of Engineering of São Carlos, University of São Paulo as a successor to the Like its predecessor, the BRAHMA hand. It is now in its 4th generation. It utilizes Hardware-in-the-loop simulation techniques to reduce the development times.
