= Dymola =

Modeling and simulation environment based on the Modelica language

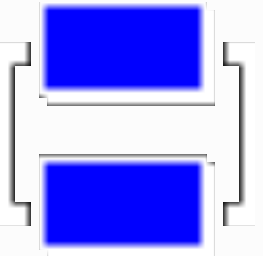

- Developer: Dassault Systèmes
- Stable release: Dymola 2026x Refresh 1 / April 17, 2026
- Operating system: Microsoft Windows, Linux
- Platform: x86-64
- Type: Modelica implementation
- License: Proprietary
- Website: www.3ds.com/products/catia/dymola

Dymola is a commercial modeling and simulation environment based on the open Modelica modeling language.

Large and complex systems are composed of component models; mathematical equations describe the dynamic behavior of the system. Developed by the French company Dassault Systèmes, Dymola is available as a standalone product and integrated in 3DEXPERIENCE as part of CATIA.

Dymola 2026x Refresh 1 supports version 3.6 of the Modelica language and version 4.1.0 of the Modelica Standard Library, as well as versions 2 and 3 of the Functional Mock-up Interface (FMI). System Structure and Parameterization (SSP 2.0) and eFMI (FMI for embedded systems) are also supported.

== History ==
Dymola was initially designed in 1978 by Hilding Elmqvist, for his PhD thesis at Lund Institute of Technology (later part of Lund University). This first version of Dymola was based on the Dynamic Modeling Language (also called Dymola) and was implemented in Simula 67. Later it was re-implemented in Pascal and C++.

In 1992, Elmqvist created the Swedish company Dynasim AB to continue the development of Dymola. In 2006, Dassault Systèmes acquired Dynasim AB and started to integrate Dymola in CATIA.

In 1996, Elmqvist initiated the Modelica design effort. The goal was to develop an object-oriented language for modeling of technical systems to reuse and exchange dynamic system models in a standardized format. Modelica is based on the Dymola language, but the experience with other modeling languages have been taken into account. In September 1997, version 1.0 of the Modelica specification was released which was the basis for a prototype implementation within Dymola. In year 2000, the non-profit Modelica Association was formed to manage the continually evolving Modelica language and the development of the free Modelica Standard Library. Since 2002, only the Modelica language is supported in Dymola.

== Application domains ==
Dymola has multi-engineering capabilities which mean that models can consist of components from many engineering domains. Using the Modelica language, sub-systems are represented by interconnected components; at the lowest level dynamic behavior is described by mathematical equations or algorithms. Connections between components form additional equations. Dymola processes the complete system of equations in order to generate efficient simulation code.

Domain-specific knowledge is represented by Modelica libraries, containing components for mechanical, electrical, control, thermal, pneumatic, hydraulic, power train, thermodynamics, vehicle dynamics, air conditioning, etc. For commercial libraries Dymola supports information hiding and encryption. Typical application areas which are facilitated by Modelica libraries include:

=== Automotive ===
The automotive applications fall into three main categories. The engine and drive train are modeled using the Engines and Powertrain libraries. The flexibility of the open Modelica language is particularly suitable for modeling hybrid or alternative drive trains using the Battery, Brushless DC Drives and Electrified Powertrains libraries. Modal bodies or flexible shafts are available through the Flexible Bodies library. Engine and battery cooling is supported by the Cooling library, which can be combined with the HVAC library. The Human Comfort library adds models of occupant comfort for complete vehicle thermal modeling. Controller components are available in the Modelica Standard Library.

The hierarchically structured, open-source, Modelica models offer unprecedented flexibility for multiple vehicle configurations while reusing common components.

=== Aerospace and Defense ===
A multitude of libraries offer the capacity to model the complex thermo-fluid systems of aircraft, ranging from fuel systems to environmental control. The Human Comfort library provides additional models of occupant comfort for cabin thermal modeling.

The Flight Dynamics library enables the rapid modeling, simulation and analysis of the flight dynamic characteristics of a wide range of aircraft and UAVs. Actuators for flight control and other subsystems use the Brushless DC Drives and Electrified Powertrains libraries. Flexible beams and modal bodies from Finite Element models are managed by the Flexible Bodies library.

=== Energy, Process and Utilities ===
Ever more stringent requirements on environmental impact drive the trend towards more detailed modeling of physics and control systems. The Heat, Ventilation and Air Conditioning (HVAC) library allows you to minimize building HVAC operating costs by selecting the correct system control strategy and avoid costly HVAC system design errors early in the building design process. The Human Comfort Library provides an integrated approach to simulate the thermal comfort within an occupied building or vehicle. Thermo-fluid system are typically modeled with the ThermalSystem library. The Industrial Process Simulation library is focused on paper and pulp industries.

=== Industrial Equipment ===
All kinds of industrial equipment can be modeled using the mechanical libraries of the Modelica Standard Library, including 3D multi-body systems. Other options are flexible beams and modal bodies originating from a Finite Element model. Actuators and control systems are modeled with Battery, Brushless DC Drives and Electrified Powertrains libraries. The thermal properties of industrial machinery are easily modeled with the Cooling library.

=== Third-party libraries ===
In addition to the libraries available in the Dymola product portfolio, several libraries have been developed by third parties, such as, Claytex , Modelon AB , TLK-Thermo and XRG Simulation . Additional free and commercial libraries are available on the Modelica Association homepage .

== Tools and interoperability ==
=== Model design tools ===
The Model Calibration option is based on a process where measured data from a real device is used to tune parameters such that the simulation results are in good agreement with the measured data.

The Design Optimization option is used to tune parameters of a device or its controller to improve system dynamics for multiple criteria and multiple cases.

The Model Management includes support for encryption of models, version control from Dymola and utilities for checking, testing and comparing models. Also included is support for common version management tools, such as CVS, SVN, GIT and the 3DEXPERIENCE platform.

=== Code and model export ===
For most steps during system development (dimensioning, detailed design, implementation), it is important to have access to a C code image of the model to run hardware in the loop, rapid prototyping simulations or to build simulators for validation or training purposes. Several options are available to achieve those activities.

Dymola supports import and export according to the Functional Mockup Interface (FMI). With appropriate options the exported code can be generated for export without any run-time license, or as source code. The exported Functional Mockup Units can then be used on several simulation platforms.

=== Cloud support ===
In addition to the standalone application on Windows and Linux, the Dymola simulation technology is also available on the cloud, offering a streamlined user interface with customizable dashboarding and pre-defined experiment setup.

== See also ==
- AMESim
- Dassault Systèmes
- EcosimPro
- Functional Mockup Interface (FMI)
- MapleSim
- Modelica
- OpenModelica
- SimulationX
- Simulink
- Wolfram SystemModeler
