= EMSO simulator =

- Developer(s): the ALSOC Project
- Stable release: 0.10.10 / February 7, 2020; 5 years ago
- Written in: C++
- Operating system: Linux, Windows
- Type: process simulation
- License: ALSOC Open source License
- Website: www.enq.ufrgs.br/trac/alsoc/wiki/EMSO

EMSO simulator is an equation-oriented process simulator with a graphical interface for modeling complex dynamic or steady-state processes. It is CAPE-OPEN compliant. EMSO stands for Environment for Modeling, Simulation, and Optimization. The ALSOC Project - a Portuguese acronym for Free Environment for Simulation, Optimization and Control of Processes -, which is based at the UFRGS, develops, maintains and distributes this object-oriented software. Pre-built models are available in the EMSO Modeling Library (EML). New models can be written in the EMSO modeling language or a user can embed models coded in C, C++ or Fortran into the simulation environment.

== See also ==
- AMPL
- APMonitor
- ASCEND
- General Algebraic Modeling System
- JModelica.org
- MATLAB
- Modelica
- List of chemical process simulators
