= WolframAlpha =

Search and answer engine

- Website type: Answer engine
- Owner: WolframAlpha LLC
- Creator: Wolfram Research
- Website: www.wolframalpha.com
- Commercial: Yes
- Registration: Optional
- Launched: May 18, 2009; 17 years ago
- Current status: Active
- Written in: Wolfram Language

WolframAlpha (Note: /ˈwʊlfrəm/ WUUL-frəm) is an answer engine developed by Wolfram Research, released in 2009. It is offered as an online service that answers queries by computing answers from externally sourced data. It is often cited as a competitor to search engines, like Google, however it computes facts, not search web pages.

== History ==
Launch preparations for WolframAlpha began on May 15, 2009, at 7:00 pm CDT with a live broadcast on Justin.tv. The plan was to publicly launch the service a few hours later. However, there were issues due to extreme load. The service officially launched on May 18, 2009, receiving mixed reviews.

The engine is based on Wolfram's earlier product Wolfram Mathematica, a technical computing platform. The coding is written in Wolfram Language, a general multi-paradigm programming language, and implemented in Mathematica. WolframAlpha gathers data from websites such as the CIA's The World Factbook, the United States Geological Survey, a Cornell University Library publication called All About Birds, Chambers Biographical Dictionary, Dow Jones, the Catalogue of Life, CrunchBase, Best Buy, and the FAA to answer queries.

In 2009, Wolfram Research introduced an application programming interface for WolframAlpha, however it is a paid developer service.

On February 8, 2012, WolframAlpha Pro was released, offering users additional features for a monthly subscription fee.

== Usage ==
Users submit queries and computation requests via a text field. WolframAlpha then computes answers and relevant visualizations from a knowledge base of structured data that comes from other sites and books. It can respond to natural language fact-based questions. It displays its "Input interpretation" of such a question, using standardized phrases. It can also parse mathematical symbolism and respond with numerical and statistical results.

WolframAlpha was used to power some searches in the Microsoft Bing and DuckDuckGo search engines, although it is no longer used to provide results. For factual question answering, WolframAlpha was used by Apple's Siri in October 2011 and Amazon Alexa in December 2018 for math and science queries. Users noticed that the Wolfram Integration for Siri was changed in June 2013 to use Bing to query certain results on iOS 7. WolframAlpha data types, which are sets of curated information and formulas that assist in creating, categorization, and filling of spreadsheet information, became available in July 2020 within Microsoft Excel. The Microsoft-Wolfram partnership ended nearly two years later, in 2022, in favor of Microsoft Power Query data types. WolframAlpha functionality in Microsoft Excel ended in June 2023. It often outperforms modern large language models at certain areas, such as facts, data, or calculations.
