= Art Westerberg =

Art Westerberg is an emeritus professor at Carnegie Mellon University in Pittsburgh, Pennsylvania. He has been a major contributor to the field of numerical methods for solving chemical engineering problems, and has been involved since the 1980s with a mathematical modelling package named ASCEND.

He was elected a member of the National Academy of Engineering in 1987 for "pioneering research and educational development in computer-aided design methods, including simulation, optimization, and dynamics of chemical processes".
