= CasADi =

- Developers: Optimization in Engineering Center (OPTEC), KU Leuven
- Stable release: 3.8.1 / 16 September 2026; 11 days ago
- Written in: C++. Interfaces to Python and GNU Octave
- Operating system: Linux, Microsoft Windows, macOS
- Type: Automatic differentiation and mathematical optimization
- License: GNU Lesser General Public License (free software)
- Website: web.casadi.org
- Repository: github.com/casadi/casadi

CasADi is a free and open source symbolic framework for automatic differentiation and optimal control.

== See also ==
- Automatic differentiation
- JModelica.org
