= Stateflow =

Control logic tool developed by MathWorks

- Control logic for an automatic transmission system
- Developer: MathWorks
- Stable release: R2018b / September 12, 2018; 7 years ago
- Preview release: R2018b / June 14, 2018; 7 years ago
- Operating system: Windows, macOS, Linux
- Platform: x64
- Type: Application software
- License: Proprietary
- Website: Stateflow product page

Stateflow (developed by MathWorks) is a control logic tool used to model reactive systems via state machines and flow charts within a Simulink model. Stateflow uses a variant of the finite-state machine notation established by David Harel, enabling the representation of hierarchy, parallelism and history within a state chart. Stateflow also provides state transition tables and truth tables.

== Common uses ==
Stateflow is generally used to specify the discrete controller in the model of a hybrid system where the continuous dynamics (i.e., the behavior of the plant and environment) are specified using Simulink.

Specific applications for Stateflow include:

- Mode logic, where each discrete mode of a system is represented by a state
- Fault management, where the Stateflow chart is used to control how the system responds to faults and failures within a system
- Task scheduling, where the Stateflow chart is used to schedule when specific tasks occur, either within the Stateflow chart or within the overall Simulink model

== Extensions ==
A number of MathWorks and third-party tools can be used with Stateflow to validate the design and generate code. For example, Simulink Verification and Validation, a MathWorks tool, can be used to check for requirements traceability and model coverage analysis. Other add-on code generation tools can be used to automatically generate C, C++, HDL, and PLC code for implementation on embedded systems.
