= Vensim =

Simulation software developed by Ventana Systems

- Developers: Ventana Systems, Inc.
- Release: 1990 (36 years ago)
- Stable release: Version 9.3.2 / July 2022 (4 years ago)
- Written in: C
- Operating system: Windows and OS X applications, Linux and iOS libraries
- Type: Simulation software
- License: Proprietary
- Website: vensim.com

Vensim is a simulation software developed by Ventana Systems. It primarily supports continuous simulation (system dynamics), with some discrete event and agent-based modelling capabilities. It is available commercially and as a free "Personal Learning Edition".

== Modeling environment ==
Vensim provides a graphical modeling interface with stock and flow and causal loop diagrams, on top of a text-based system of equations in a declarative programming language. It includes a patented method for interactive tracing of behavior through causal links in model structure (the patent expired in 2012), as well as a language extension for automating quality control experiments on models called Reality Check.

The modeling language supports arrays (subscripts) and permits mapping among dimensions and aggregation. Built-in allocation functions satisfy constraints that are sometimes not met by conventional approaches like logit. It supports discrete delays, queues and a variety of stochastic processes.

There are multiple paths for cross sectional and time-series data import and export, including text files, spreadsheets and ODBC. Models may be calibrated against data using optimization, Kalman Filtering or Markov chain Monte Carlo methods. Sensitivity analysis options provide a variety of ways to test and sample models, including Monte Carlo simulation with Latin Hypercube sampling.

Vensim model files can be packaged and published in a customizable read-only format that can be executed by a freely available Model Reader. This allows sharing of interactive models with users who do not own the program and/or who the model author does not wish to have access to the model's code base.

== Applications ==
Vensim is general-purpose software, used in a wide variety of problem domains. Common or high-profile applications include:

- Transportation and Energy
- Business Strategy
- Health
- Security and Terrorism
- Project Management
- Marketing Science in Pharmaceuticals and Consumer Products
- Logistics
- Environment

== See also ==
- Comparison of system dynamics software
- Computer simulation
- List of computer simulation software
- Monte Carlo simulation
