= Wolfram Research =

American multinational company

Coordinates: 40.097128°N 88.245690°W

Wolfram Research, Inc.
- Type: Private
- Industry: Computer software, publishing, research and development
- Founded: 1987; 39 years ago
- Founder: Stephen Wolfram, Theodore Gray
- Headquarters: Champaign, Illinois, United States
- Key people: Stephen Wolfram (president & CEO); Conrad Wolfram (Director of Strategic Development & Wolfram Research Europe Limited CEO)
- Products: Wolfram Mathematica, Wolfram Workbench, gridMathematica, webMathematica, Wolfram Alpha, SystemModeler, Wolfram Programming Lab, Wolfram One, Wolfram Engine for Developers, Function Repository, Neural Network Repository, Data Repository
- Number of employees: ~400
- Divisions: Wolfram Media Inc., Wolfram Research Europe Ltd. in the United Kingdom, Wolfram Research Asia Ltd. in Japan and Wolfram Research South America in Peru.
- Website: wolfram.com

Wolfram Research, Inc. (/ˈwʊlfrəm/ WUUL-frəm) is an American multinational company that creates computational technology. Wolfram's flagship product is the technical computing program Wolfram Mathematica, first released on June 23, 1988. Other products include WolframAlpha, Wolfram System Modeler, Wolfram Workbench, gridMathematica, Wolfram Finance Platform, webMathematica, the Wolfram Cloud, and the Wolfram Programming Lab. Wolfram Research founder Stephen Wolfram is the CEO. The company is headquartered in Champaign, Illinois, United States.

== History ==
The company launched Wolfram Alpha, an answer engine on May 16, 2009. It brings a new approach to knowledge generation and acquisition that involves large amounts of curated computable data in addition to semantic indexing of text.

Wolfram Research acquired MathCore Engineering AB on March 30, 2011.

On July 21, 2011, Wolfram Research launched the Computable Document Format (CDF). CDF is an electronic document format designed to allow easy authoring of dynamically generated interactive content.

In June 2014, Wolfram Research officially introduced the Wolfram Language as a new general multi-paradigm programming language. It is the primary programming language used in Mathematica.

On April 15, 2020, Wolfram Research received $5,575,000 to help pay its employees during the COVID-19 pandemic as part of the U.S. government's Paycheck Protection Program administered by the Small Business Administration. The loan was forgiven.

== Products and resources ==
=== Mathematica ===
Mathematica began as a software program for doing mathematics by computer, and has evolved to cover all domains of technical computing software, with features for neural networks, machine learning, image processing, geometry, data science, and visualizations. Central to Mathematica's mission is its ability to perform symbolic computation, for example, the ability to solve indefinite integrals symbolically. Mathematica includes a notebook interface and can produce slides for presentations. Mathematica is available in a desktop version, a grid computing version, and a cloud version.

=== Wolfram Alpha ===
Wolfram Alpha is a free online service that answers factual queries directly by computing the answer from externally sourced curated data, rather than providing a list of documents or web pages that might contain the answer as a search engine might. Users submit queries and computation requests via a text field and Wolfram Alpha then computes answers and relevant visualizations. In 2012, a paid "Pro" level with additional features was released.

In 2016, Wolfram Alpha Enterprise, a business-focused analytics tool, was launched. The program combines data supplied by a corporation with the algorithms from Wolfram Alpha to answer questions related to that corporation.

=== Wolfram System Modeler ===
Wolfram System Modeler is a platform for engineering as well as life-science modeling and simulation based on the Modelica language. It provides an interactive graphical modeling and simulation environment and a customizable set of component libraries. The primary interface, ModelCenter, is an interactive graphical environment including a customizable set of component libraries. The software also provides a tight integration with Mathematica. Users can develop, simulate, document, and analyze their models within Mathematica notebooks.

== Publishing ==
Wolfram Research publishes several free websites including the MathWorld and ScienceWorld encyclopedias. ScienceWorld, which launched in 2002, is divided into sites on chemistry, physics, astronomy and scientific biography. In 2005, the physics site was deemed a "valuable resource" by American Scientist magazine. However, by 2009, the astronomy site was said to suffer from outdated information, incomplete articles and link rot.

The Wolfram Demonstrations Project is a collaborative site hosting interactive technical demonstrations powered by a free Mathematica Player runtime.

Wolfram Research publishes The Mathematica Journal. Wolfram has also published several books via Wolfram Media, Wolfram's publishing arm. In addition, they have experimented with electronic textbook creation.

== Media activities ==
Wolfram Research served as the mathematical consultant for the CBS television series Numb3rs, a show about the mathematical aspects of crime-solving.

== See also ==
- A New Kind of Science
- Ed Pegg, Jr.
- Eric W. Weisstein
- Computer-based mathematics education
