= Wolfram SystemModeler =

Wolfram System Modeler
- Developer: Wolfram Research
- Stable release: 15.0.0 / June 16, 2026; 4 months ago
- Operating system: Windows, macOS and Linux
- Type: Object-oriented programming
- License: Proprietary
- Website: Wolfram SystemModeler

Wolfram System Modeler, developed by Wolfram MathCore, is a platform for engineering as well as life-science modeling and simulation based on the Modelica language. It provides an interactive graphical modeling and simulation environment and a customizable set of component libraries.

== Interface ==
Wolfram System Modeler's primary interface, Model Center, is an interactive graphical environment including a customizable set of component libraries. Models developed in Model Center can be simulated in the Simulation Center. The software also provides a tight integration with the Mathematica environment. Users can develop, simulate, document, and analyze their Wolfram System Modeler models within Mathematica notebooks. The software is used in the engineering field as well as in the life sciences.

== Editions ==
Originally developed by MathCore Engineering as MathModelica, it was acquired by Wolfram Research on March 30, 2011. It was then re-released as Wolfram SystemModeler on May 23, 2012, with improved integration with Wolfram Mathematica.

== Modeling language ==
Wolfram System Modeler uses the free object-oriented modeling language Modelica, a language designed for the modeling of physical systems and designed to support library development and model exchange. It is a modern language built on acausal modeling with mathematical equations and object-oriented constructs to facilitate reuse of modeling knowledge. Since Version 11.3, the Wolfram Language supports direct access to Modelica libraries for system simulation and analysis from a notebook interface.

== See also ==
- OpenModelica
- JModelica.org
- AMESim
- APMonitor
- Modelica
- Mathematica
- Modelling
- Simulation
- Simulink
- Computer simulation
- Dymola
- SimulationX
- MapleSim
