= MODELISAR =

MODELISAR was an ITEA 2 (Information Technology for European Advancement) European project aiming to improve the design of systems and of embedded software in vehicles. The MODELISAR goals were to:

- Support the AUTOSAR (AUTomotive Open System ARchitecture) standard (AUTOSAR is a standardized automotive software architecture)
- Develop the Functional Mock-up Interface standardized interface

The MODELISAR project started in 2008, ended Dec 2011 to define the Functional Mock-up Interface specifications, deliver technology studies, prove the FMI concepts through Use Cases elaborated by the consortium partners and enable tool vendors to build advanced prototypes or in some cases even products. MODELISAR has been awarded during ITEA 2 & ARTEMIS co summit with a Silver award.

Although in MODELISAR the focus was driven by automotive Use Cases, the FMI specifications could be independently defined. Therefore the FMI can now address other industrial domains such as Energy, Aerospace, Rail.
