= Wolfram Mathematica =

Computational software program

- Developer: Wolfram Research
- Release: June 23, 1988; 38 years ago
- Stable release: 15.0.1 (July 2026; 2 months ago) [±]
- Written in: Wolfram Language, C/C++, Java
- Platform: Windows, macOS, Linux (with separate support for Raspberry Pi OS), online service; all platforms support 64-bit implementations (list)
- Available in: English, Chinese, Japanese
- Type: Computer algebra, numerical computations, information visualization, statistics, user interface creation
- License: Proprietary
- Website: www.wolfram.com/mathematica/

Wolfram Mathematica (also known as Mathematica) is a software system with built-in libraries for several areas of technical computing that allows machine learning, statistics, symbolic computation, data manipulation, network analysis, time series analysis, quantum computation framework, NLP, optimization, plotting functions and various types of data, implementation of algorithms, creation of user interfaces, and interfacing with programs written in other programming languages. It was conceived by Stephen Wolfram, and is developed by Wolfram Research of Champaign, Illinois. The Wolfram Language is the programming language used in Mathematica. Mathematica 1.0 was released on June 23, 1988 in Champaign, Illinois and Santa Clara, California. Mathematica's Wolfram Language is fundamentally based on Lisp.

== Notebook interface ==
Mathematica is split into two parts: the kernel and the front end. The kernel interprets expressions (Wolfram Language code) and returns result expressions, which can then be displayed by the front end.

The original front end, designed by Theodore Gray in 1988, consists of a notebook interface and allows the creation and editing of notebook documents that can contain code, plaintext, images, and graphics.

Code development is also supported in a range of standard integrated development environment (IDE) including Eclipse, IntelliJ IDEA, Atom, Vim, Visual Studio Code and Git. The Mathematica Kernel also includes a command line front end.

Other interfaces include JMath, based on GNU Readline and WolframScript which runs self-contained Mathematica programs (with arguments) from the UNIX command line.

== High-performance computing ==
Capabilities for high-performance computing were extended with the introduction of packed arrays in version 4 (1999) and sparse matrices (version 5, 2003), and by adopting the GNU Multiple Precision Arithmetic Library to evaluate high-precision arithmetic.

Version 5.2 (2005) added automatic multi-threading when computations are performed on multi-core computers. This release included CPU-specific optimized libraries. In addition Mathematica is supported by third party specialist acceleration hardware such as ClearSpeed.

In 2002, gridMathematica was introduced to allow user level parallel programming on heterogeneous clusters and multiprocessor systems and in 2008 parallel computing technology was included in all Mathematica licenses including support for grid technology such as Windows HPC Server 2008, Microsoft Compute Cluster Server and Sun Grid.

Support for CUDA and OpenCL GPU hardware was added in 2010.

== Extensions ==
As of Version 14, there are 6,602 built-in functions and symbols in the Wolfram Language. Stephen Wolfram announced the launch of the Wolfram Function Repository in June 2019 as a way for the public Wolfram community to contribute functionality to the Wolfram Language. There are currently more than 3000 functions contributed as Resource Functions. In addition to the Wolfram Function Repository, there is a Wolfram Data Repository with computable data and the Wolfram Neural Net Repository for machine learning.

Wolfram Mathematica is the basis of the Combinatorica package, which adds discrete mathematics functionality in combinatorics and graph theory to the program.

== Connections to other applications, programming languages, and services ==
Communication with other applications can be done using a protocol called Wolfram Symbolic Transfer Protocol (WSTP). It allows communication between the Wolfram Mathematica kernel and the front end and provides a general interface between the kernel and other applications.

Wolfram Research freely distributes a developer kit for linking applications written in the programming language C to the Mathematica kernel through WSTP using J/Link., a Java program that can ask Mathematica to perform computations. Similar functionality is achieved with .NET /Link, but with .NET programs instead of Java programs.

Other languages that connect to Mathematica include Haskell, AppleScript, Racket, Visual Basic, Python, and Clojure.

Mathematica supports the generation and execution of Modelica models for systems modeling and connects with Wolfram System Modeler.

Links are also available to many third-party software packages and APIs.

Mathematica can also capture real-time data from a variety of sources and can read and write to public blockchains (Bitcoin, Ethereum, and ARK).

It supports import and export of over 220 data, image, video, sound, computer-aided design (CAD), geographic information systems (GIS), document, and biomedical formats.

In 2019, support was added for compiling Wolfram Language code to LLVM.

Version 12.3 of the Wolfram Language added support for Arduino.

== Computable data ==
Mathematica is also integrated with Wolfram Alpha, an online answer engine that provides additional data, some of which is kept updated in real time, for users who use Mathematica with an internet connection. Some of the data sets include astronomical, chemical, geopolitical, language, biomedical, airplane, and weather data, in addition to mathematical data (such as knots and polyhedra).

== Reception ==
BYTE in 1989 listed Mathematica as among the "Distinction" winners of the BYTE Awards, stating that it "is another breakthrough Macintosh application ... it could enable you to absorb the algebra and calculus that seemed impossible to comprehend from a textbook".

Mathematica has been criticized for being closed source. Wolfram Research claims keeping Mathematica closed source is central to its business model and the continuity of the software.

== See also ==
- Comparison of multi-paradigm programming languages
- Comparison of programming languages
- Comparison of regular expression engines
- Dynamic programming language
- Fourth-generation programming language
- Functional programming
- List of computer algebra systems
- List of computer simulation software
- List of information graphics software
- Literate programming
- Mathematical markup language
- Mathematical software
- SageMath
- Wolfram Language
- Wolfram SystemModeler, a physical modeling and simulation tool which integrates with Mathematica
- WolframAlpha, a web answer engine
