= Simcenter Amesim =

Multiphysic 0D/1D simulation software for digital twin models

- Developer: Siemens Digital Industries Software
- Release: 1995
- Stable release: Simcenter Amesim 2310
- Platform: Cross-platform
- Available in: English, Chinese
- Type: modeling, simulation, Graphical user interface
- License: Proprietary

Simcenter Amesim is a commercial simulation software for the modeling and analysis of multi-domain systems. It is part of systems engineering domain and falls into the mechatronic engineering field.

The software package is a suite of tools used to model, analyze and predict the performance of mechatronics systems. Models are described using nonlinear time-dependent analytical equations that represent the system's hydraulic, pneumatic, thermal, electric or mechanical behavior. Compared to 3D CAE modeling this approach gives the capability to simulate the behavior of systems before detailed CAD geometry is available, hence it is used earlier in the system design cycle or V-Model.

To create a simulation model for a system, a set of libraries is used. These contain pre-defined components for different physical domains. The icons in the system have to be connected and for this purpose each icon has ports, which have several inputs and outputs. Causality is enforced by linking the inputs of one icon to the outputs of another icon (and vice versa).

Simcenter Amesim libraries are written in C language, Python and also support Modelica, which is a non-proprietary, object-oriented, equation based language to model complex physical systems containing, e.g., mechanical, electrical, electronic, hydraulic, thermal, control, electric power or process-oriented subcomponents. The software runs on Linux and on Windows platforms.

Simcenter Amesim is a part of the Siemens Digital Industries Software Simcenter portfolio. This combines 1D simulation, 3D CAE and physical testing with intelligent reporting and data analytics. This portfolio is intended for development of complex products that include smart systems, through implementing a Predictive Engineering Analytics approach.

== History ==
The Simcenter Amesim software was developed by Imagine S.A., a company which was acquired in June 2007 by LMS International, which itself was acquired in November 2012 by Siemens AG.

The Imagine S.A. company was created in 1987 by Dr Michel Lebrun from the University Claude Bernard in France, to control complex dynamic systems coupling hydraulic servo-actuators with finite-elements mechanical structures. The initial engineering project involved the deck elevation of the sinking Ekofisk North Sea petroleum platforms.

In the early 1990s the association with Pr C. W. Richards, coming from the University of Bath in England, led to the first commercial release of Simcenter Amesim in 1995 which was then dedicated to fluid control systems.

Simcenter Amesim is used by companies in the automotive, aerospace and other advanced manufacturing industries.

== Usage ==
Simcenter Amesim is a multi-domain software that supports modeling a variety of physics domains (hydraulic, pneumatic, mechanic, electrical, thermal, electromechanical). It is based on the Bond graph theory.

Under the Windows platform, Simcenter Amesim works with the free Gcc compiler, which is provided with the software. It also works with the Microsoft Visual C++ compiler and its free Express edition. Since the version 4.3.0 Simcenter Amesim uses the Intel compiler on all platforms.

== Platform facilities ==
Simcenter Amesim features:

- Platform Facilities
  - graphical user interface, interactive help, supercomponents, post-processed variables, experiments management, meta-data, statechart designer
- Analysis Tools
  - table editor, plots, dashboard, 3D animation, replay of results, linear analysis (eigenvalues, modal shapes, transfer functions, root locus), activity index, power and energy computation
- Optimization, Robustness, DOE
  - Design Of Experiments, optimization, Monte-Carlo
- Solvers and Numerics
  - LSODA, DASSL, DASKR, fixed-step solvers, discrete partitioning, parallel processing, Simcenter Amesim/Simcenter Amesim cosimulations
- Software Interfaces
  - generic co-simulation (to be used to co-simulate with any software coupled to Simcenter Amesim), functional mock-up interface (export)
- MIL/SIL/HIL and Real-Time
  - plant/control, various real-time targets
- Simulator Scripting
  - scripting functions to pilot the simulations from Microsoft Excel, MATLAB, Scilab, Python, and support for C and Python development and reverse-engineering script generation from a model
- Customization
  - own customized pre and post-processing tools with python, script caller assistant, editor of parameters group, app designer
- Modelica Platform
  - support of the Modelica modeling language
- 1D/3D CAE
  - CAD Import, CFD software co-simulation, FEA import of reduced modal basis with pre-defined frontier nodes, MBS software cosimulation and import/export
- Development
  - Users can develop submodels from different standard submodels (supercomponent) using Component Customization functionality or by programming them in C or in Fortran with the Submodel Editor.

== Physical libraries ==
Physical libraries from which models can be built include control, electrical networks, mechanical, fluid, thermodynamic, IC engine, and aerospace and defense libraries.

== Education and research ==
Simcenter Amesim is used by engineering schools and universities. It is also the reference framework for various research projects in Europe.

== Release history ==
Name/Version	Build Number	Date
AMESim	-	1995
AMESim 1.0	v100	1996
AMESim 1.5	v150	1997
AMESim 2.0	v200	1998
AMESim 2.5	v250	April 1999
AMESim 3.0	v300	June 2000
AMESim 3.5	v350	May 2001
AMESim 4.0	v400	March 2002
AMESim 4.1	v410	April 2003
AMESim 4.2	v420	September 2004
AMESim 4.3	v430	October 2005
AMESim Rev 7A	v700	April 2007
AMESim Rev 7B	v710	December 2007
AMESim Rev 8A	v800	June 2008
AMESim Rev 8B	v810	December 2008
AMESim Rev 9	v900	November 2009
AMESim Rev 10	v1000	November 2010
AMESim Rev 11	v1100	November 2011
AMESim Rev 12	v1200	March 2013
AMESim Rev 13	v1300	December 2013
LMS Imagine.Lab Amesim 14	v1400	February 2015
LMS Imagine.Lab Amesim 15	v1501	July 2016
Simcenter Amesim 16	v1600	January 2018
Simcenter Amesim 17	v17	October 2018
Simcenter Amesim 2019.1	v2019.1	April 2019
Simcenter Amesim 2019.2	v2019.2	October 2019
Simcenter Amesim 2020.1	v2020.1	April 2020
Simcenter Amesim 2020.2	v2020.2	October 2020
Simcenter Amesim 2021.1	v2021.1	April 2021
Simcenter Amesim 2021.2	v2021.2	October 2021
Simcenter Amesim 2022.1	v2022.1	April 2022
Simcenter Amesim 2210	v2210	October 2022
Simcenter Amesim 2304	v2304	April 2023
Simcenter Amesim 2310	v2310	October 2023
Simcenter Amesim 2404	v2404	April 2024
Simcenter Amesim 2411	v2411	November 2024
Simcenter Amesim 2504	v2504	April 2025
Simcenter Amesim 2511	v2511	November 2025
Simcenter Amesim 2604	v2604	April 2026
Simcenter Amesim 2611	v2611	November 2026

== See also ==
- Model-based design
- Lumped-element model
- Distributed-element model
- Bond graphs
- GT-SUITE
- Mechatronics
- Control theory
- Real-time computing
- Hardware-in-the-loop simulation
- Systems engineering
- Simulink
- 20-sim
- Wolfram SystemModeler
