= Simulink =

Programming environment

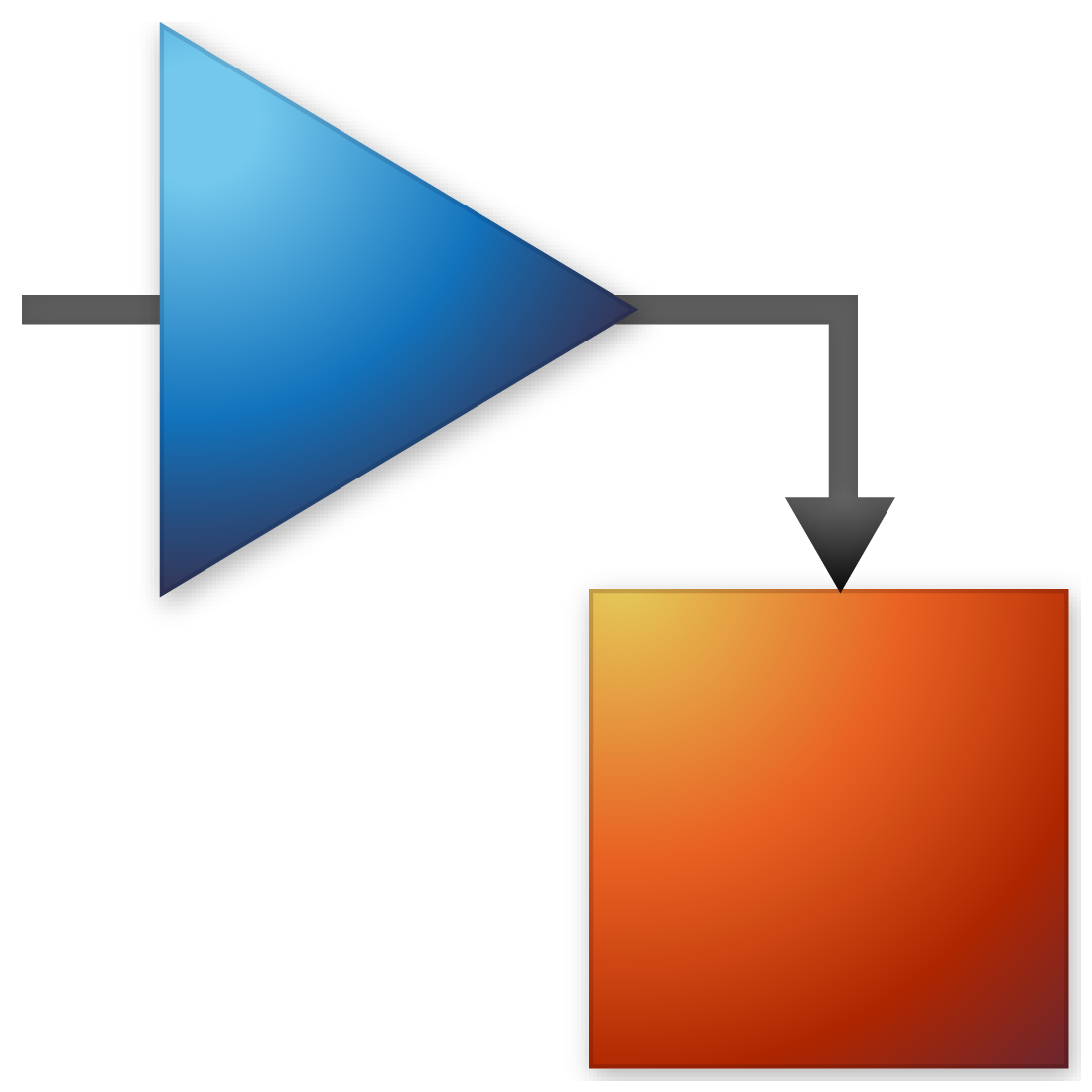

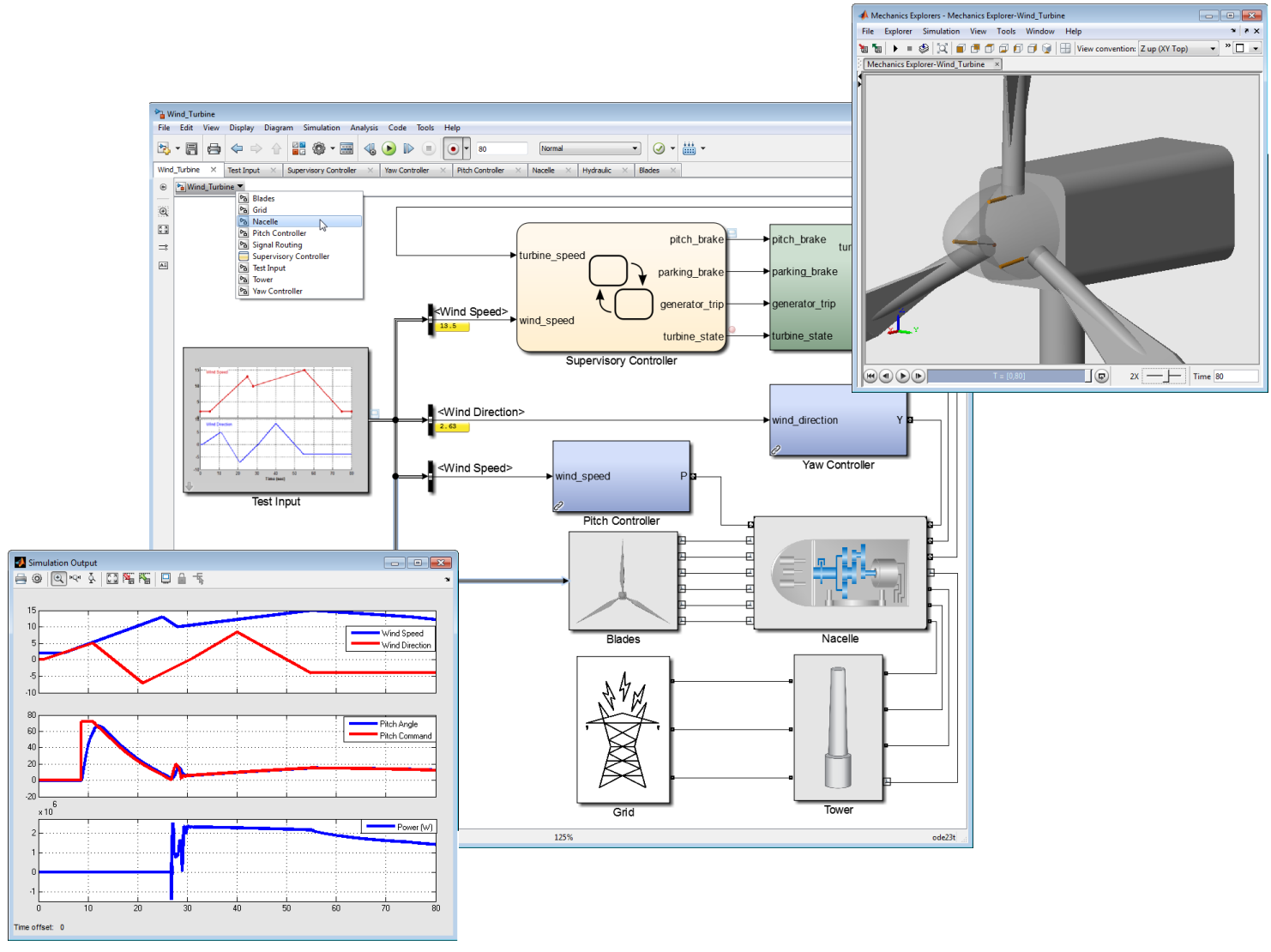
- Simulink model of a wind turbine
- Developer: MathWorks
- Release: 1984; 42 years ago
- Stable release: 24.2 (part of R2024b) / September 12, 2024; 2 years ago
- Operating system: Linux, macOS, Microsoft Windows
- License: Proprietary
- Website: mathworks.com

Simulink is a MATLAB-based graphical programming environment for modeling, simulating and analyzing multidomain dynamical systems. Its primary interface is a graphical block diagramming tool and a customizable set of block libraries. It offers tight integration with the rest of the MATLAB environment and can either drive MATLAB or be scripted from it. Simulink is widely used in automatic control and digital signal processing for multidomain simulation and model-based design.

== Add-on products ==
MathWorks and other third-party hardware and software products can be used with Simulink. For example, Stateflow extends Simulink with a design environment for developing state machines and flow charts. Simscape is an add-on product that extends Simulink with support for physical modeling. Developed by MathWorks, it enables the modeling and simulation of multidomain physical systems by connecting physical components whose interactions represent domains such as electrical, mechanical, thermal, and fluid systems. Simscape models can be combined with standard Simulink block diagrams, allowing the simulation of systems that couple physical dynamics with control algorithms and signal-based components. Coupled with another of their products, Simulink can automatically generate C source code for real-time implementation of systems. As the efficiency and flexibility of the code improves, this is becoming more widely adopted for production systems, in addition to being a tool for embedded system design work because of its flexibility and capacity for quick iteration. Embedded Coder creates code efficient enough for use in embedded systems.

Simulink Real-Time (formerly known as xPC Target), together with x86-based real-time systems, is an environment for simulating and testing Simulink and Stateflow models in real-time on the physical system. Another MathWorks product also supports specific embedded targets. When used with other generic products, Simulink and Stateflow can automatically generate synthesizable VHDL and Verilog.

Simulink Verification and Validation enables systematic verification and validation of models through modeling style checking, requirements traceability and model coverage analysis. Simulink Design Verifier uses formal methods to identify design errors like integer overflow, division by zero and dead logic, and generates test case scenarios for model checking within the Simulink environment.

SimEvents is used to add a library of graphical building blocks for modeling queuing systems to the Simulink environment, and to add an event-based simulation engine to the time-based simulation engine in Simulink.

== Release history ==
MATLAB Version	Release name	Simulink version	Year	Notes
1.0			1984	
2			1986	
3			1987	
3.5			1990	Ran on MS-DOS but required at least a 386 processor. Version 3.5m required math coprocessor
4			1992	Renamed from Simulab to SIMULINK
4.2c	R7		1994	Ran on Windows 3.1. Required a math coprocessor
5.0	R8		1996	
5.1	R9		1997	
5.1.1	R9.1		1997	
5.2	R10		1998	
5.2.1	R10.1		1998	
5.3	R11		1999	
5.3.1	R11.1		1999	
6.0	R12		2000	
6.1	R12.1		2001	
6.5	R13	Simulink 5.0.2	2002	
6.5.1	R13SP1	Simulink 5.1	2003	
6.5.2	R13SP2	Simulink 5.2	2003	
7	R14	Simulink 6.0	2004	
7.0.1	R14SP1	Simulink 6.1	2004	
7.0.4	R14SP2	Simulink 6.2	2005	
7.1	R14SP3	Simulink 6.3	2005	
7.2	R2006a	Simulink 6.4	2006	
7.3	R2006b	Simulink 6.5	2006	
7.4	R2007a	Simulink 6.6	2007	
7.5	R2007b	Simulink 7.0	2007	Last release for Windows 2000 and PowerPC Mac.
7.6	R2008a	Simulink 7.1	2008	
7.7	R2008b	Simulink 7.2	2008	
7.8	R2009a	Simulink 7.3	2009	First release for 32-bit & 64-bit Windows 7.
7.9	R2009b	Simulink 7.4	2009	First release for Intel 64-bit Mac, and last for Solaris SPARC.
7.10	R2010a	Simulink 7.5	2010	Last release for Intel 32-bit Mac.
7.11	R2010b	Simulink 7.6	2010	
7.12	R2011a	Simulink 7.7	2011	
7.13	R2011b	Simulink 7.8	2011	
7.14	R2012a	Simulink 7.9	2012	
8	R2012b	Simulink 8.0	2012	
8.1	R2013a	Simulink 8.1	2013	
8.2	R2013b	Simulink 8.2	2013	
8.3	R2014a	Simulink 8.3	2014	
8.4	R2014b	Simulink 8.4	2014	
8.5	R2015a	Simulink 8.5	2015	
8.6	R2015b	Simulink 8.6	2015	Last release supporting 32-bit Windows
9.0	R2016a	Simulink 8.7	2016	
9.1	R2016b	Simulink 8.8	2016	
9.2	R2017a	Simulink 8.9	2017	
9.3	R2017b	Simulink 9.0	2017	
9.4	R2018a	Simulink 9.1	2018	
9.5	R2018b	Simulink 9.2	2018	
9.6	R2019a	Simulink 9.3	2019	Simulink Onramp; Schedule Editor;
9.7	R2019b	Simulink 10.0	2019	Toolstrip; Messages; Blockset Designer; Subsystem Reference
9.8	R2020a	Simulink 10.1	2020	
9.9	R2020b	Simulink 10.2	2020	
9.10	R2021a	Simulink 10.3	2021	
9.11	R2021b	Simulink 10.4	2021	
9.12	R2022a	Simulink 10.5	2022	
9.13	R2022b	Simulink 10.6	2022	
9.14	R2023a	Simulink 10.7	2023	
23.2	R2023b	Simulink 23.2	2023	
24.1	R2024a	Simulink 24.1	2024	
24.2	R2024b	Simulink 24.2	2024	

== See also ==
- List of aerospace engineering software
