= Intopia =

Management simulation tool

Intopia (or INTOPIA) is a strategic management simulation tool in the form of a business game, and is used in a variety of undergraduate and graduate university courses. It is used to teach students the concepts of strategic management of multinational businesses in a simulated world of up to four "nations". The number of participant executives or students can range from 9 to 100+, and are divided into 3−25 teams, each managing a company. The participants practice their skills over a few hours, receiving immediate feedback on their decisions.

Intopia has been used as a tool in teaching business strategy in universities in over 55 countries, including 18 in the U.S. A positive 1995 review by Peter Palij of Columbia University concluded that the tool is "a benchmark for measuring other competitive simulations".

== History ==
Development of management simulation software began at the University of Chicago in the early days of academic computing. This work led by Hans B. Thorelli and Robert L. Graves resulted in the release in 1963 of the early mainframe game INTOP, which was employed for teaching in over 160 institutions world-wide over the period 1963-1995.

The modern tool INTOPIA was first released in 1995, after a development by an international team over a period of approximately seven years. The team included Thorelli (coordinator, presently Distinguished Professor Em. in the Kelley School of Business, Indiana University), Graves (then Prof. of Mathematics and Computers in the School of Business, University of Chicago), and Juan-Claudio Lopez (Professor in Escuela de Administracion, Universidad Catolica, Santiago de Chile). The company Intopia, Inc. was registered in the State of Indiana, USA, in the mid-90s to further develop and manage the simulation. The present version of INTOPIA B2B was developed by Thorelli, Graves and Scott McDaniel of Personix (Indianapolis, Indiana). Thorelli's work with the simulation is being carried on by his son, Tom, and grandson, Erik Thorelli.

== Key features ==
Intopia is an imaginary world of four regions, with a maximum of four currencies. The world has multiple competing firms which may produce a maximum of two types of products of varying types. These products fall into two distinct categories of consumer durables – X's and Y's, although those X's and Y's may represent different products within each simulation.

Each company is required to make decisions regarding the current and future periods. A company's unilateral decision can range from introducing new products, performing R&D, stepping up production, initiating market research, setting prices and sales/promotions for its products. As well, there is a great amount of inter-company business, with each company able to purchase or sell to other companies.

As well as the production of X's and Y's, companies may choose to sell insurance, provide financial or analytical services, or license new products to gain revenue.

Each decision affects the bottom line of the company which is reflected at the end of the period, after the simulation has run.

== See also ==
- Beer distribution game
- Business simulation
- Business simulation game
- Education
- Friday Night at the ER
- Leadership Series
- Military simulation
- Project management simulation
- Roleplay simulation
- Serious game
- Simulations and games in economics education
- Strategic management simulation
- Training simulation
