= Business simulation (disambiguation) =

Business simulation may refer to

- Business simulation game - a computer game genre.
- Training simulation
- Simulations and games in economics education
- Business simulation
- Business game
