= Business game (disambiguation) =

A business game is a simulation game which simulates a business.

The expression may also refer to one of the following.

- Business simulation
- Simulations and games in economics education
- Training Simulation
- Business simulation game, a type of videogames
- Another name for the board game Mine a Million
