= Marketing simulation game =

Virtual method of testing

Marketing simulation games provide participants with an interactive method of testing out marketing decisions in an environment which is virtual or which has game characteristics. Common game topics belong to categories such as: marketing strategy, product positioning, pricing strategies, consumer behaviour. Marketing games usually focus on the marketing landscape of a certain business industry or a company. A marketing simulation game usually contains a number of scenarios and provides participants with results in response to their decisions.

The games can be played either by individuals or teams. The learning environment is usually a collaborative and/or competitive market in which participants represent companies which need to take decisions in an iterative manner, usually on a round-by-round basis.

== In education ==
Faria and Wellington (2004) found that 64.1% of 1,085 faculty members surveyed in American Universities were using games with a focus on marketing. Pedagogical expectations are that students using these simulations will learn more about marketing strategy concepts through the application of marketing knowledge as well as gain marketing application skills.

The advance of digital technology in marketing has led to a gap in digital literacy among marketing professionals. Consequently, there is increasing pressure on marketing educators to help their students develop digital marketing skills. Computerized marketing simulation games have been widely used as teaching and learning resources in Marketing Strategy and Management courses – and continue to be adopted as a meaningful pedagogical tool. The usage of computerized marketing simulation games is consistent with learners' growing interest in acquiring and developing digital skills.

Research has found that students can use both marketing simulation games and real marketing projects with comparable feelings of reality and enhanced perceptions of learning.

Between 2008 and 2017 Google ran the "Google Online Marketing Challenge" (GOMC), an online competition aimed at higher education students. The format of the competition allowed student teams to work with SMEs and nonprofit organizations in recognition that many marketing students are employed by one such organization. The goal of the participants was to develop a precampaign report followed by online marketing campaigns. According to research, for an effective experiential learning activity instructors should emphasize that students need to plan, execute, and assess their actions, which requires the provision of feedback mechanisms as part of the experience.

=== Instructional design considerations ===
There is a need for more empirical research to examine the varying characteristics of existing marketing simulations in light of various course requirements and various student groups. There is emerging instructional research on the learning framework proposed by marketing simulation games which focuses on how game analytics and learning analytics provide students with personalized experiences and how this increases their engagement. Often this research is focused on just one marketing simulation game platform used in a small number of universities coming from the same country or region.

Acceptance of computer-based simulation devices in learning can affect learning outcomes. It has been argued that computer-based simulation games, involving the use of technology that users are less familiar with, can place an additional burden on learners and generate frustration and low satisfaction that can negatively affect learning outcomes Valid criticism appears when students are involved in ‘gaming’ the simulation algorithm in search of higher returns. In this mode of play, students typically manifest behaviour where they adopt high-risk decisions, often giving little thought on the decision-making process itself, thus reducing learning outcomes.

== Other usages of marketing simulations ==
Additional usage for marketing simulations has been identified: as an aid in decision making and as a means for gaining further insight into a system as well as a guideline for research.

== See also ==
- Business simulation
- Serious game
