= Serious play =

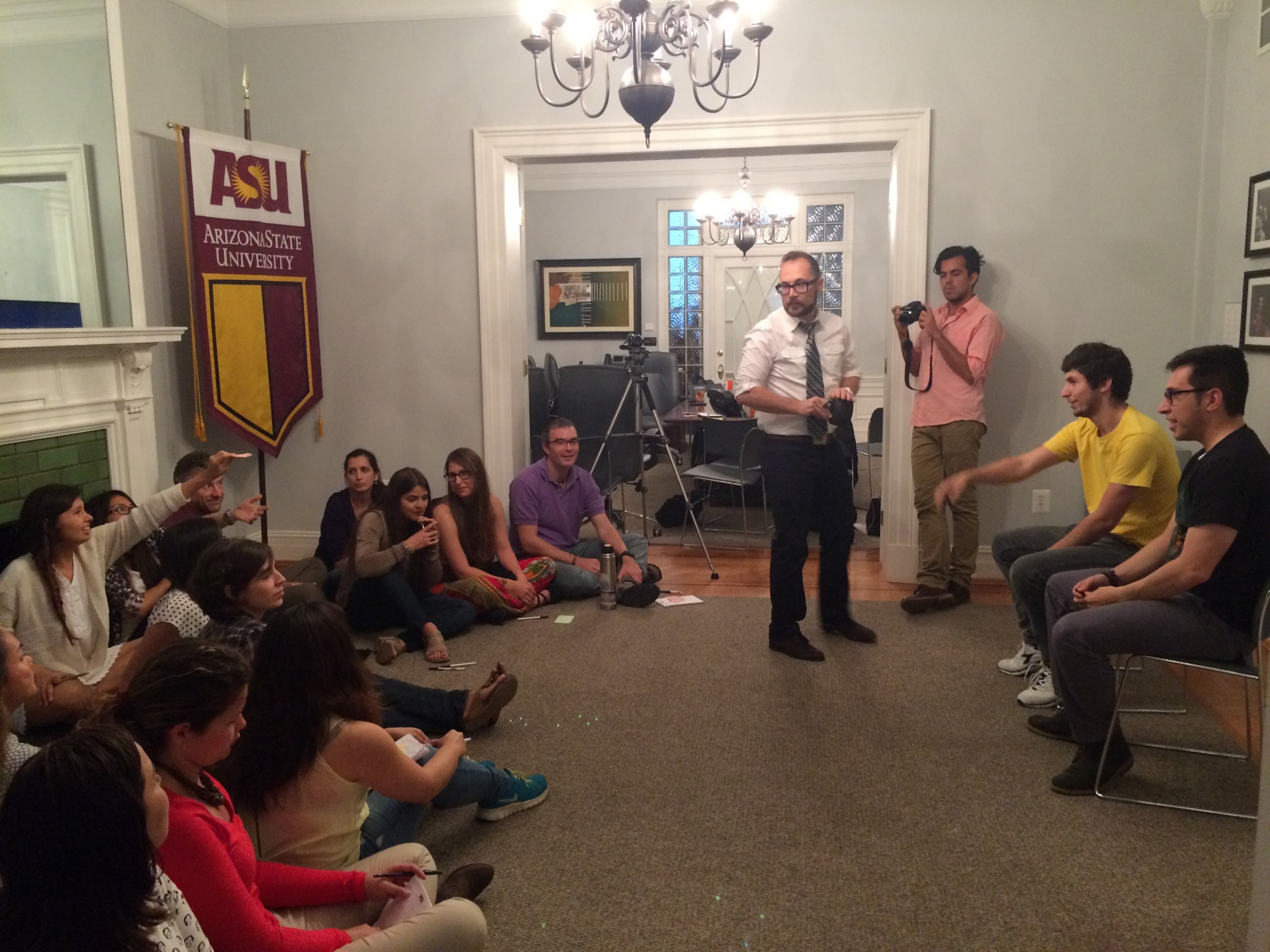
Improv theater as a method for enhancing public communication

The term serious play refers to an array of playful inquiry and innovation methods that serve as vehicles for complex problem-solving, typically in work-related contexts. Lego Serious Play is one of the best known examples; however, serious play methods also include improv theater, role play exercises, low fidelity prototyping, as well as certain simulations and gamification interventions, etc.

In recent years, an increasing body of academic and popular literature have argued that being in a playful mode (engaging in playful processes and applying a playful, open mindset) can foster creativity and innovation as it emphasizes possibilities, freedom, and process versus outcome, self-consciousness, responsibility and shame. According to Gauntlett (2007), "The non-judgmental environment of play, it is claimed, is more likely to foster surprising and innovative ideas" (see Stephenson (1998); Terr (2000); Gee (2004); Kane (2005)).

The term "serious play" was popularized with the publication of Michael Schrage's book Serious Play: How the World's Best Companies Simulate to Innovate in 2000.

Serious intent methods can be used as vehicles for engaging teams in the five stages of the design thinking process: empathizing, defining, ideating, prototyping, and testing. The methods are designed to create a safe environment for exploring and sharing ideas and help engage teams in behaviors and mindsets that integrate disparate knowledge and align team efforts towards problem-solving and organizational change. Serious play methods are most often used in creative industries (e.g. product and service design), yet also hold a promise to foster creativity, innovation and entrepreneurship in general management practices as well. While much of the serious play literature focuses on business, its benefits are applied in numerous fields, including military, education, healthcare, psychology, and governance. Serious play methods can bring together diverse groups of stakeholders/collaborators, and elicit empathy, active listening, reflexivity, and high levels of participation.

Because serious play is still an emergent field and used in various contexts, it is sometimes branded as or referred to by other names. For instance, the University of Foreign Military and Cultural Studies, Fort Leavenworth, Kansas, uses an array of serious play methods when dealing with complex problems, which they refer to as liberating structures. Similarly to serious play is the concept of strategic play, which was the subject of a facilitator's guide book written by Jacqueline Lloyd Smith & Denise Meyerson.

== Impact ==
While the concept of "serious play" may sound like an oxymoron, it is the dual nature of the concept that makes it powerful. It is play with a purpose and intentionality that goes beyond simply having fun. The serious aspect requires a degree of focus on a task or challenge, while the play aspect emphasizes imagination and toying with boundaries. Together, these seemingly juxtapose components are able to foster a deeper engagement – also known as a state of flow where participants lose track of time and their inner critique. Being intentful also enables us to better tolerate the ambiguity and uncertainty that characterizes many of the problems modern organizations face.

Using play as a way to develop adaptive human potential is not new. In "Product Design and Intentional Emergence facilitated by Serious Play", Mabogunje et al. summarize that "play has:

- The cognitive benefit of drawing on the imagination to develop new insight.
- The social benefit of developing new frames for interaction.
- The emotional benefits of providing positive affective associations as well as a safe context in which to take risks, to try on new roles, and to explore new potential forms of practice.
- The tendency to lose sense of time and engrossment resulting in increased involvement"

Through their non-judgmental and cross sector/hierarchy communicative approaches, serious play methods allow for solutions and connections to emerge that more rigid traditional methods had missed.

There exists an array of serious play methods – from "energizers" to prototyping methods and from open-ended, emergence-oriented interventions to goal-achievement-oriented interventions (e.g. gamification) – all of which offer different affordances in terms of knowledge creation, sharing, and conversion.

== Characterizing different methods ==
Table 1 below characterizes five types of serious play methods, that are reoccurring in the academic literature, according to the following five parameters:

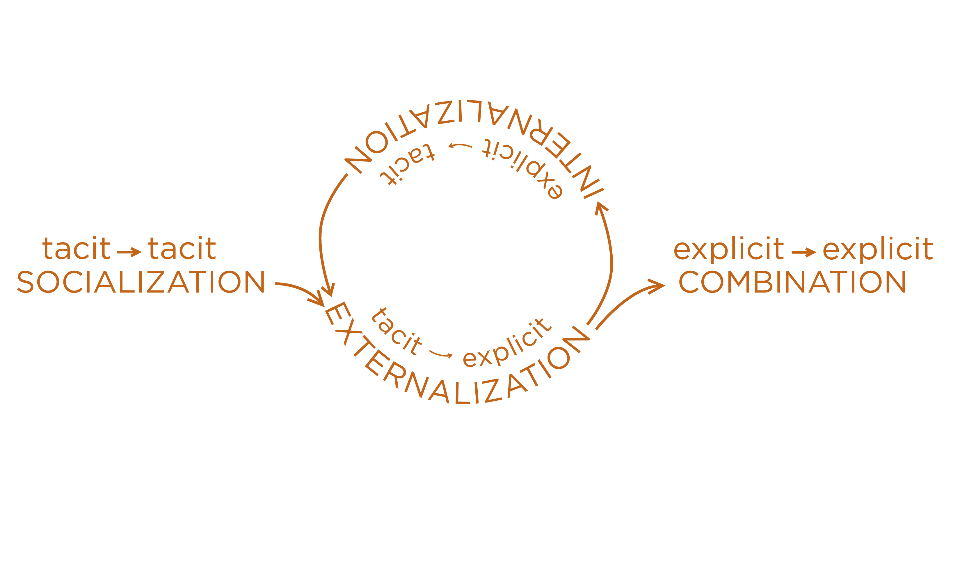
Wheel of Knowledge

Purpose/rational: What is the purpose of applying the method?

Role(s) of the participant(s): Do the participants work individually or in teams? Which types of roles/activities do they engage in?

Level of Materiality: Does the method typically involve physical artifacts? Are the meaning of these literal or metaphorical? Or, in contrast, is the intervention typically delivered through a digital/virtual game or an incentive structure?

Degree of structure: Is the method explorative/open-ended? Does it allow for emergence? Or is there a "one best way" of doing the activity? Is there a quantifiable output?

Phase applicability: In which of the phase(s) mentioned in the Wheel of Knowledge is this method applicable? (Socialization, Externalization, Internalization, and/or Combination).

Serious play method	Purpose	Role(s) of participant(s)	Materiality	Degree of structure	Phase applicability	References
LEGO Serious Play	To access and make knowledge, wisdom, and perspectives shared through model construction and storytelling. To facilitate a constructive dialogue (ideate, reflect, and strategize) about a given topic/ issue.	Participants take on roles as: individual builder, storyteller, active listener, co-constructor of physical models and metaphorical meaning. Non-competitive. The physical constraints of the building system puts emphasis on metaphors and meaning-making and takes pressure off making something that resembles.	Material and metaphorical	Semi structured: Facilitated, structured process and turn taking. Process does allow for pursuing new directions as new knowledge emerge. Participants build and tell in response to prompt, there is however no right or wrong answer – the model is their interpretation.	Exploration, socialization, ideation, innovation	(Roos & Victor, 1999) (Mabogunje et al., 2008) (Gauntlett & Holzwarth, 2006)
Low fidelity prototyping	To engage participants in generating, sharing, and maturing ideas through constructing, explaining, and refining low fidelity prototypes.	Participants take on roles as: individual builder, storyteller, active listener. Non-competitive, though participants may feel self-conscious about their drawing or building skills.	Highly material and literal	Semi structured: Facilitated, structured process and turn taking. However, the process allows for pursuing new directions as new knowledge emerge.	Exploration, socialization, ideation, innovation	(Schulz et al., 2015) (Sanders & Stappers, 2008) (Von Hippel, 2006)
Role-play / improv	To practice thinking and (inter)acting improvisational, understanding visceral reactions, suspending judgment, and going with a situation as it develops through unrehearsed open-ended scenarios.	Participants are impromptu storytellers as they act out their interpretation of the prompt, through using their body-language, mimic, voice, humor, gesticulation, etc. Audience when other participants are performing. Non-competitive, though participants often feel self-conscious when pushing their comfort zone.	Generally immaterial, but can include props	Low degree of imposed structure, Explorative in nature, Open-ended within the contextual prompt given and adhering to the rules of improv: say "yes and...", make statements, agree to the premise proposed, blurt out what comes to mind, whatever happens is right (Robson, 2015)	Exploration, socialization	(Boess, 2006) (Thoring & Mueller, 2012) (Lloyd-Smith & Meyerson, 2015)
Simulations	To practice task-specific interactions with people and/or technologies by simulating scenarios in risk-free educational environments (physical or virtual).	Participants are the main character of their own mission. Can be individual or collaborative (team based). Performance may be rated comparatively to personal best or that of other individuals.	Virtual (e.g. virtual reality) or material (taking place in the physical world)	Structured: goals and desired outcomes are predefined. Room to experiment with ways of doing the task. Learning by doing.	Internalization (learning), socialization (if done in groups)	(Colella, 2000) (Rieber, 1996) (Aldrich, 2005)
Gamification	To incentivize productivity and/or behavior change through competition and/or a game-like reward- structure	Participants strive to achieve the goals outlined to obtain rewards and reinforcing, positive feedback. This can be individually or collaboratively. Typically competitive (against personal best or other participants/teams)	Immaterial (e.g. company incentive structure) or virtual (e.g. game or app)	Highly structured: "one best way", desired goals and outcomes are predefined. May appear open-ended to the participant, however, structure is imposed through the underlying game algorithms or company policies (incentives).	Optimization, exploitation	(Jagoda, 2013) (Millen, DiMicco, & Street, 2012) (Muntean, 2011)

Workshops will often use multiple serious play methods to complement each other and allow participants to explore different applicability phases of the challenges they face.

== See also ==
- Serious game
