= Tovertafel =

Games console used in social care settings

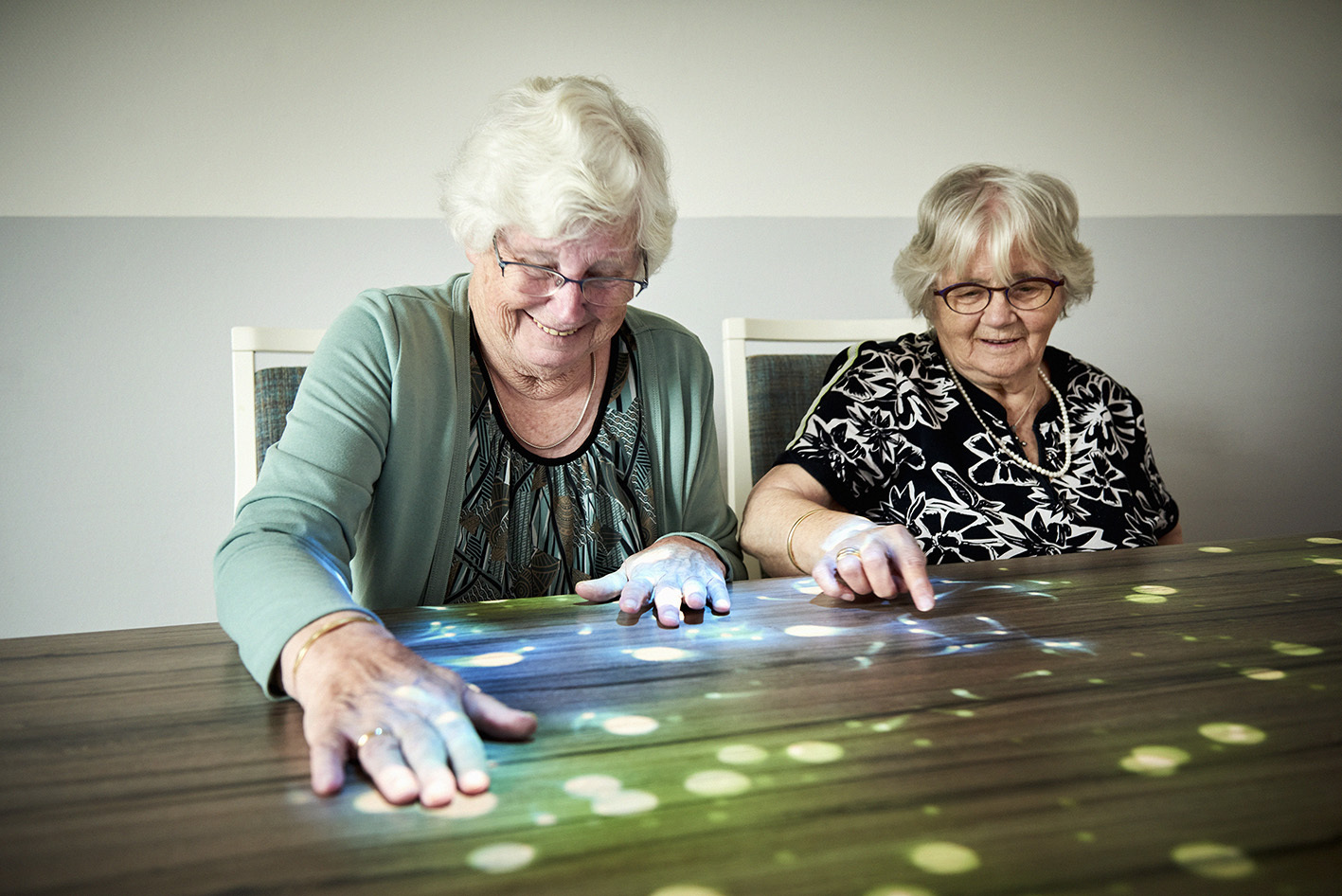
- A Tovertafel in use
- Type: Serious game, Assistive technology, Health technology
- Inception: 2015
- Manufacturer: Tover (formerly Active Cues)
- Models: Tovertafel; Tovertafel Pixie
- Website: tover.care

The Tovertafel (Dutch for "Magic Table") is an interactive game console for people with cognitive challenges developed by the Dutch company Tover. It projects light-based games onto tables, floors, and other surfaces to support cognitive, social and emotional well-being among people with dementia, intellectual disabilities and children in special education or with a developmental disorder. Since its introduction in 2015, the system has been installed in thousands of care communities and institutions worldwide, from care homes to special education schools and libraries.

The current product line includes the Tovertafel 3, a ceiling-mounted console designed for group activities, and the Tovertafel Pixie, a mobile and flexible version intended for person-centered care.

== History ==
The idea behind the Tovertafel originated in 2009 as part of the PhD research of Hester Anderiesen-Le Riche at the Faculty of Industrial Design Engineering at Delft University of Technology. Her research focused on reducing apathy and promoting cognitive and physical well-being among people living with dementia.

After early prototypes and small-scale evaluations, the first Tovertafel officially entered the care market in 2015, the same year that Anderiesen-Le Riche founded the company that would commercialize this system. Initially established under the name Active Cues, the company oversaw the product’s introduction in Dutch care institutions and supported its early international rollout. In subsequent years the organization rebranded as Tover, under which name it continues to develop and market the Tovertafel product line not only for people with dementia, but also for adults with intellectual disabilities and children in special education.

== Technology ==
The system of the Tovertafel combines a high-quality projector, motion-tracking sensors, audio, and specialized software to cast interactive light games onto flat surfaces such as tables, walls, floors, or wheelchair trays. The games respond to users’ hand and finger movements, allowing them to interact with the projections in real time. The device is designed to allow participation without prior training or technical knowledge.

A library of interactive games is available for the Tovertafel, developed in a co-design process with researchers, care professionals, and user groups. The games are organized into five different levels according to their complexity, allowing every player to participate at their own level and according to their own abilities. Tovertafel games are designed to support people at different stages of dementia, individuals with intellectual disabilities across a spectrum of ability levels, and children with diverse learning needs.

== Products ==
=== Tovertafel ===
The first Tovertafel was launched in the Netherlands in 2015 and was later updated as the Tovertafel 2. These ceiling-mounted systems were designed for installation in care institutions, projecting games onto flat surfaces to encourage group activities and social interaction while reducing agitation. In 2025, Tover introduced the Tovertafel 3, which incorporates improvements in projection quality, durability and user interface. It is intended for both group and one-on-one activities in dementia care, intellectual disability care, and inclusive education settings.

=== Tovertafel Pixie ===
The Tovertafel Pixie is the mobile version of the Tovertafel, designed for flexible use in both individual and small-group settings within care and education. Launched in 2023, the Pixie is particularly used with people who have limited mobility and in one-on-one care contexts. Like the Tovertafel, the Pixie can project games onto tables, walls, ceilings, and wheelchair or bed trays, allowing play sessions to take place outside of communal spaces. In 2025, the design of the Tovertafel Pixie was recognized with a Red Dot Design Award in the Product Design category.

== Research and impact ==
Various peer-reviewed studies and evaluations have investigated the changes in apathy, social interaction and quality of life in dementia care and related contexts. A 2017 study in the Tijdschrift voor Gerontologie en Geriatrie reported short-term improvements in quality-of-life indicators during and immediately after play sessions with the Tovertafel, which lasted up to a week after play. A controlled intervention published in Frontiers in Neurology in 2024 found lower levels of apathy and increases in positive social interactions among residents in German nursing homes who played with the Tovertafel, while also noting the need for further long-term research.

Beyond dementia care, research has also explored the Tovertafel’s use among people with intellectual disabilities, as well as children with diverse learning needs. A study from the School of Health, Care and Social Welfare at Mälardalen University found an increase in social interaction and self-reliance among players with intellectual disabilities after having used the Tovertafel.

== Awards ==
- Red Dot Award: Product Design (2025) - Tovertafel Pixie
- EdTech Breakthrough Award: Adaptive Learning Innovation of the Year (2024) - Tovertafel
- CES Editors' Choice: Most Promising Innovation (2022) - Tovertafel
- CCI France Pays-Bas Business Awards: Jury's Prize (2022) - Tover
- KVK Innovation Top 100 (2019) - Tover
- PwC Social Impact Lab: Best Start-Up (2018) - Tover (then Active Cues)
- EIT Digital Challenge: Digital Wellbeing Award (2018) - Tover (then Active Cues)
- EY Entrepreneur Of The Year (finalist) (2018) - Hester Anderiesen-Le Riche
- Dutch Game Awards: Best Serious Game (2015) - Tovertafel
- Boer & Croon: Co-Generation Award (2015) - Tover (then Active Cues)
- New Venture Award (2015) - Tover (then Active Cues)
