= Basketball Pro Management =

- Developer: Umix Studios
- Publisher: Umix Studios
- Platform: Microsoft Windows
- Release: (2012 PC): January 12, 2012 (2013 PC): February 15, 2013 (2014 PC): December 12, 2013 (2015 PC): November 19, 2014)
- Genres: Sports game, Business simulation, Sports Management
- Mode: Single player

Basketball Pro Management (BPM) is a video game that gives the player the opportunity to manage the basketball team of his choice. This management game includes both European Championships and the NBA. The last version is Basketball Pro Management 2015. Umix Studios and Cyanide decided to create a new game for the season 2015-2016 : Pro Basketball Manager

== History ==
BPM was developed by Victor Da Costa. In an interview with Basketball News in March 2012, he explained that the game was developed while he was student at INSA Lyon, before seeking an editor. The Umix Studios are composed by the people involved in the project (database and design).

== Concept ==
The principle is similar to the football management games, the player is the coach and team manager. He must manage his starting lineup, recruitment, training of young players, the detection of new talent, training, implementation tactics, budget management, management the staff (assistant coach, physiotherapist, scouts, physical trainer), tactics and systems, management games.

The game has a tactic management: it is possible to create your own systems by choosing the actions of each player at every moment. The Data Editor allows the player to modify the characteristics of any player / team / coach. The game is available in French and English. The game has twenty playable championships, including four in France. The NBA has been added in updates a few weeks after the release of the 2012 version.

In 2012, the game developers have proposed updates to fix reported bugs on the forum and to add some features asked by the players.

== Versions ==
=== 2012 ===
The 2012 version (for the 2011–2012 season) first announced in fall 2011 was finally released on January 12, 2012. Critical opinion is generally good and often highlights the potential of the game. In May 2012, the game has been released on CD via Tradewest.

=== 2013 ===
The 2013 version was scheduled for the last quarter of 2012. After several postponements, the game was finally released on February 15, 2013 with new features, the main ones are :

- Optimized loading time
- Improved simulations (AI vs. AI and AI vs player)
- New way to create a team from A to Z
- Full review of the interface
- European Cups
- Addition of transfer / loan
- Individual Awards for players
- Injury Management

=== 2014 ===
The 2014 version was announced on March 25, 2013. It was released on December 12, 2013. it contains a lot of new features such as US Universities, women teams or a new game engine.
