= Port operations simulator =

Application of simulation technology

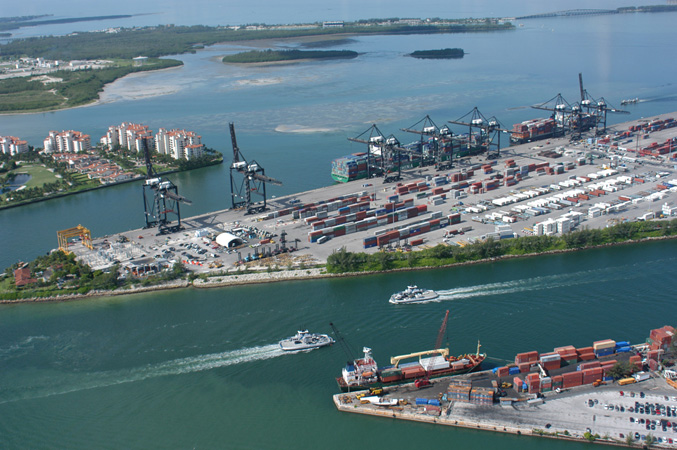
Port operations simulations are used to model and simulate conditions at large ports, such as the Port of Miami.

Port operations simulators are applications of simulation technology used to determine the outcomes of potential changes to factors affecting ports, security policies, traffic patterns, port expansion or growth, natural disasters, inclement weather, or terrorist activity.

== NISAC Port Operations Simulator ==
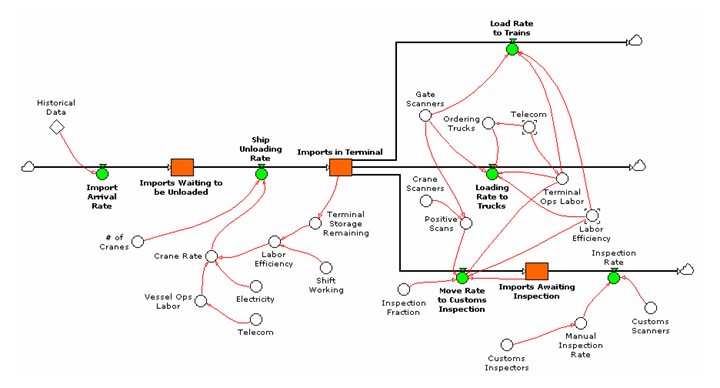
Flowchart of NISAC's Port Operations Simulator inputs

The National Infrastructure Simulation Analysis Center, a program within the Department of Homeland Security, has developed a Port Operations Simulator, which is designed to model, simulate, and analyze the effects on port economic health as a result of potential shipping container and port security policies. There is also a companion program, the Economic Simulator, which analyzes the long-term economic impact of security policies in the port. The simulator was originally designed specifically for ports in Portland, Seattle, and Houston, but it can be modified to apply to other ports as well. The Houston adaptation has built-in scenarios, including loss of electric power, loss of telecommunications, labor disruptions, and major security threats. Users have the ability to direct controls in order to determine the best response and recovery plans to these types of scenarios.

== SimPort ==
SimPort is a serious game simulation in which the users must plan and manage a port expansion called the Second Maasvlakte at the Port of Rotterdam in the Netherlands. Each team in the game is given three laptops and each user is given a role from the options of General Director, Commercial Director, or Director of Infrastructure and Management. The game consists of four one-hour rounds: Round 1 consists of defining strategies and creating an allocation plan; the subsequent rounds each represent ten years of management of the site.

The game is targeted primarily at actual Port of Rotterdam staff, but is considered applicable to others in training and education settings.

According to the official website, the Port of Rotterdam has three aims in the use of this game:

1. Gain better insight into any unforeseen, undesirable and unintentional effects of one or more development strategies and design variations in the medium term (10–30 years) as a result of exogenous uncertainties (economic, market, technological) and due to strategic behavior of the parties involved.
2. Stimulate holistic and multidisciplinary thinking within the Port of Rotterdam on commercial and technical/infrastructural considerations, interests and choices.
3. Improve the results of negotiations with respect to contracts (customers) and equipment (infrastructure) in the port area.

== See also ==
- Simulation
- Military simulation
- Simulated reality
- Serious game
