= International Simulation and Gaming Association =

The International Simulation and Gaming Association (ISAGA) is an international organization for scientists and practitioners who develop and use simulation, gaming (in the meaning of learning games) and related methodologies: role-play, structured experiences, policy exercises, computer simulation, play, virtual reality, game theory, debriefing, experiential learning, and active learning. Gambling is expressly excluded from the interests of the organization.

== See also ==
- Serious game
- Business game
