= Simulations and games in industry education =

Two examples of simulation usage. (Left) A factory simulation (Right) A medical simulation.

Simulation-based learning refers to the use of simulations (models of problems or events) and games as a means to deliver curriculum and education. This technique serves as a supplement, or an alternative to traditional classroom education. Simulation-based learning arose from the need for more interactive and immersive forms of learning in order to deliver education in high-skill fields, such as manufacturing, healthcare, and aviation. In many industrial sectors, risky conditions and occupational hazards make hands-on education difficult to deliver, limiting the scalability of traditional educational methods in industrial settings. As such, simulations and games can be used to train workers in a digital environment where there is limited risk to safety and equipment that may be present in the real environment.

== Background ==
Simulations, which are used to model certain situations, have been used by humans for many centuries. In the 1900s BCE, Ancient Babylonian doctors used clay livers to simulate outcomes of illnesses. In the 600s BCE, Laozi (Lao Tzu) wrote of automation machines made of various materials, and historians have described ancient tools used to simulate medical operations and cures. In Europe, during the Renaissance, the church periodically forbade human dissections. As a result, wax figures were used to train doctors and learned individuals in anatomy. In the 18th century, Georg von Langsdorff wrote his doctoral thesis, Phantasmatum Sive Machinarum, which described the use of mannequins to practice obstetric skills. In aviation, flight simulators were used to train pilots to fly in fast-changing situations where real-word training was infeasible. Pilots used wooden barrels and apparatus to mimic the cockpit. After World War Two, Pan American Airways made the Boeing 377 Stratocruiser simulator, which did not have a visual system but was a complete replica of the plane used to simulate civilian flights.

== Development ==
In historical times, training simulations were physical, and were designed to replicate another physical system. In the 1970s, digital simulations arose as a way to deliver curriculum through computers. The advent of mixed reality (XR), including virtual reality (VR) and augmented reality (AR) greatly improved the prospect of simulation-based learning due to the fact that these technologies allowed learners to engage in immersive learning in a 3D environment that could replicate a physical environment. This training was developed and applied for workers who were training for industrial settings, they were trained in simulations before using real equipment, which mitigates the risk of injury

Generally, a training simulation begins with the defining of learning outcomes, or training goals. This consists of a set of ideal outcomes, such as concepts the user should learn. These outcomes should be outlined as actions the user should be able to take upon completion and revision of the simulation. As the first step to development, the developer should define what will be simulated. In the industrial setting, this can either be the whole area (a virtual space), or a single machine (virtual object or asset). In the former case, the simulation typically models a whole process or a multi-step process involving many tools or machines. In the latter case, the simulation will model a single object, such as a machine upon which the learner must perform a set of tasks. Once the assets are developed and assembled, a storyboard must be defined. This storyboard is a set of steps and instructions the user will follow.

In additional detail, it is recommended to define the order of fidelity, or the extent to which the simulation will mimic the real-life process. Note that simulations with high orders of fidelity (those that are also tied to the real-environment) are considered digital twins. Simulations with high orders of fidelity generally result in higher success rates for learners in the real process.

== Application ==
Simulation-based can be used in various industrial settings. Most commonly, they are used in sectors where in-person training is expensive, dangerous, or intractable. In the manufacturing industry, training simulations have been deployed to allow learners to gain technical skills in an immersive environment. One limitation is that knowledge transfer is not promised, meaning that simulations are not necessarily a complete replacement to in-person learning. In drilling, virtual reality simulations were developed to allow for open-ended task completion and immersive training experiences. The use of interactive and immersive simulations allowed for higher completion rates with fewer mistakes made, as opposed to those who did not use the simulation. In the semiconductor industry, researchers developed and tested a virtual reality simulation modelling the process of photolithography, the learning objectives were the steps involved in photolithography (UVL), and the simulation had a secondary goal of semiconductor outreach and awareness (due to the current semiconductor technician shortage). The simulation resulted in gains in interest and knowledge in the learners.

== See also ==
- Simulations and games in economics education
- Training simulation
- Virtual reality
