= Roleplay simulation =

Experiential learning method

Roleplay simulation is an experiential learning method in which either amateur or professional roleplayers (also called interactors) improvise with learners as part of a simulated scenario. Roleplay is designed primarily to build first-person experience in a safe and supportive environment. Roleplay is widely acknowledged as a powerful technique across multiple avenues of training and education.

== History ==
Howard Barrows invented the model for medical patient role-playing in 1963 at the University of Southern California. This program allowed doctors practice taking medical histories and conducting physical examinations by participating in a one-on-one scenario with a role-player. The role-players (called Standardized Patients or SP) were also trained on providing performance evaluations after the fiction of the scenario was complete. Barrows continued to evolve this model, eventually bringing it to other physicians in the 1970s, and into the academic world in the 1980s. Today, many hospitals and medical universities have their own standardized patient programs that employ part-time role-players trained to specific standards of interaction. The Association of Standardized Patient Educators has members from six different continents.

An industry of professional skills training emerged in the late 1990s, primarily in the United Kingdom. Companies began hiring acting professionals to create situational dramas to be overcome by learners as part of an experiential learning methodology. Today, there are more than twenty companies in the UK that specialize in providing role-players for workplace simulations.

Professional military role-players have been employed by the US military since 2001, primarily as a response to the September 11, 2001 attacks in the United States. Preparation requirements for the resulting War in Afghanistan created a need for cultural role-players skilled in languages and customs of current theaters of war to populate simulated villages and urban environments.

== Use in experiential learning ==
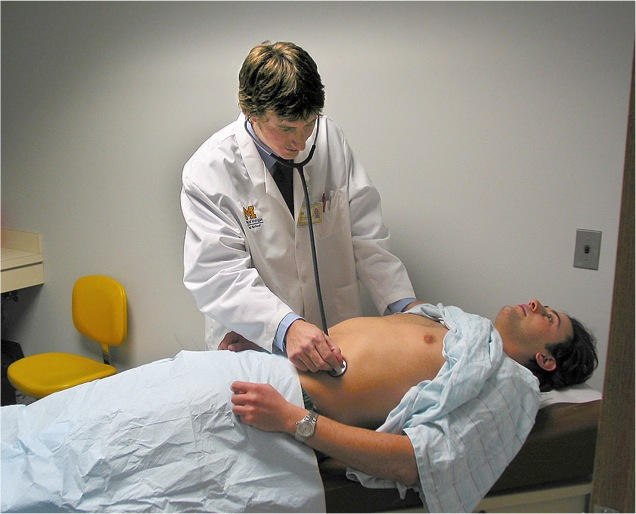
A medical trainee examining the abdomen of a Standardized Patient

=== Medical training ===
Medical role-players typically fall under the category of Standardized Patients (SP). SPs are extensively used in medical and nursing education to allow students to practice and improve their clinical and conversational skills for an actual patient encounter. SPs commonly provide feedback after such encounters. They are also useful to train students to learn professional conduct in potentially embarrassing situations such as pelvic or breast exams. SPs are also used extensively in testing of clinical skills of students, usually as a part of an objective structured clinical examination. Typically, the SP will use a checklist to record the details of the encounter.

Role-players can engage with medical learners in one of two ways:

1. As part of a simulation wherein both learner and role-player are aware of the fiction, and have established rules and boundaries (i.e. the "fiction contract").
2. Surreptitiously, for purposes of healthcare provider evaluation or health informatics research.

Medical role-players can also be used to portray distraught or bereaved family members of patients in emergency medicine scenarios, giving the learners practice in handling emotionally difficult or distracting situations.

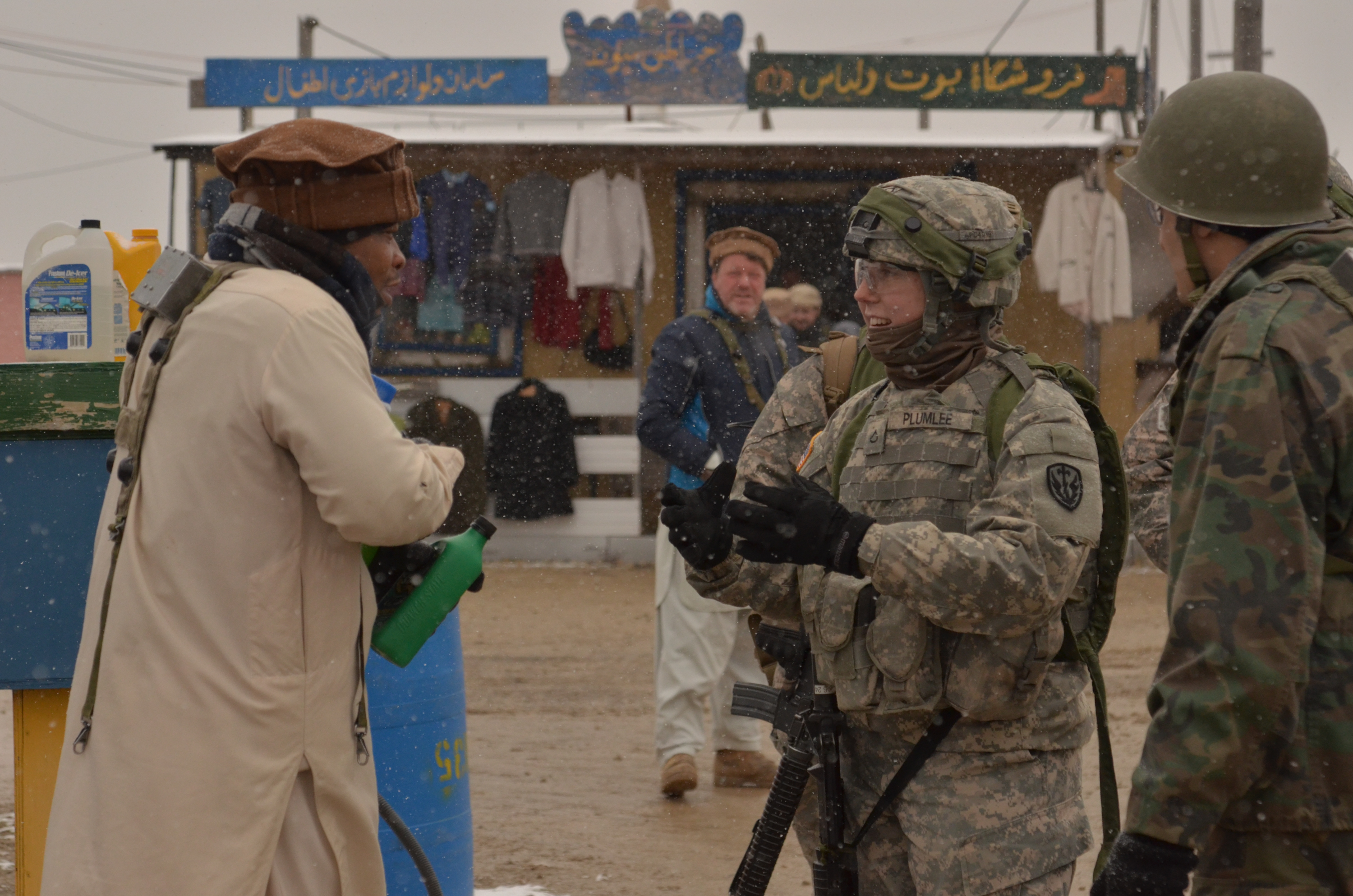
A U.S. Soldier, second from right, with the 3rd Squadron, 2nd Cavalry Regiment interacts with a civilian role player during a mission rehearsal exercise at the Joint Multinational Readiness Center in Hohenfels

=== Military training ===
Role-players in military simulations can portray various types of interactive characters:

==== Opposing force (OPFOR) ====
Role-players are trained to accurately emulate real-life enemies in order to provide a more realistic experience for military personnel. To avoid the diplomatic ramifications of naming a real nation as a likely enemy, training scenarios often use fictional countries with similar military characteristics to the expected real-world foes.

==== Civilians on the battlefield (COB) ====
Some COB role-players are expatriates of foreign countries who have the looks, language skills, and cultural familiarity needed to accurately portray key points of interaction in a military scenario. Others are locals who may be unskilled as actors, and primarily serve to populate a particular area of operations within a military scenario so that soldiers can be challenged with problems of crowd control, or situational awareness.

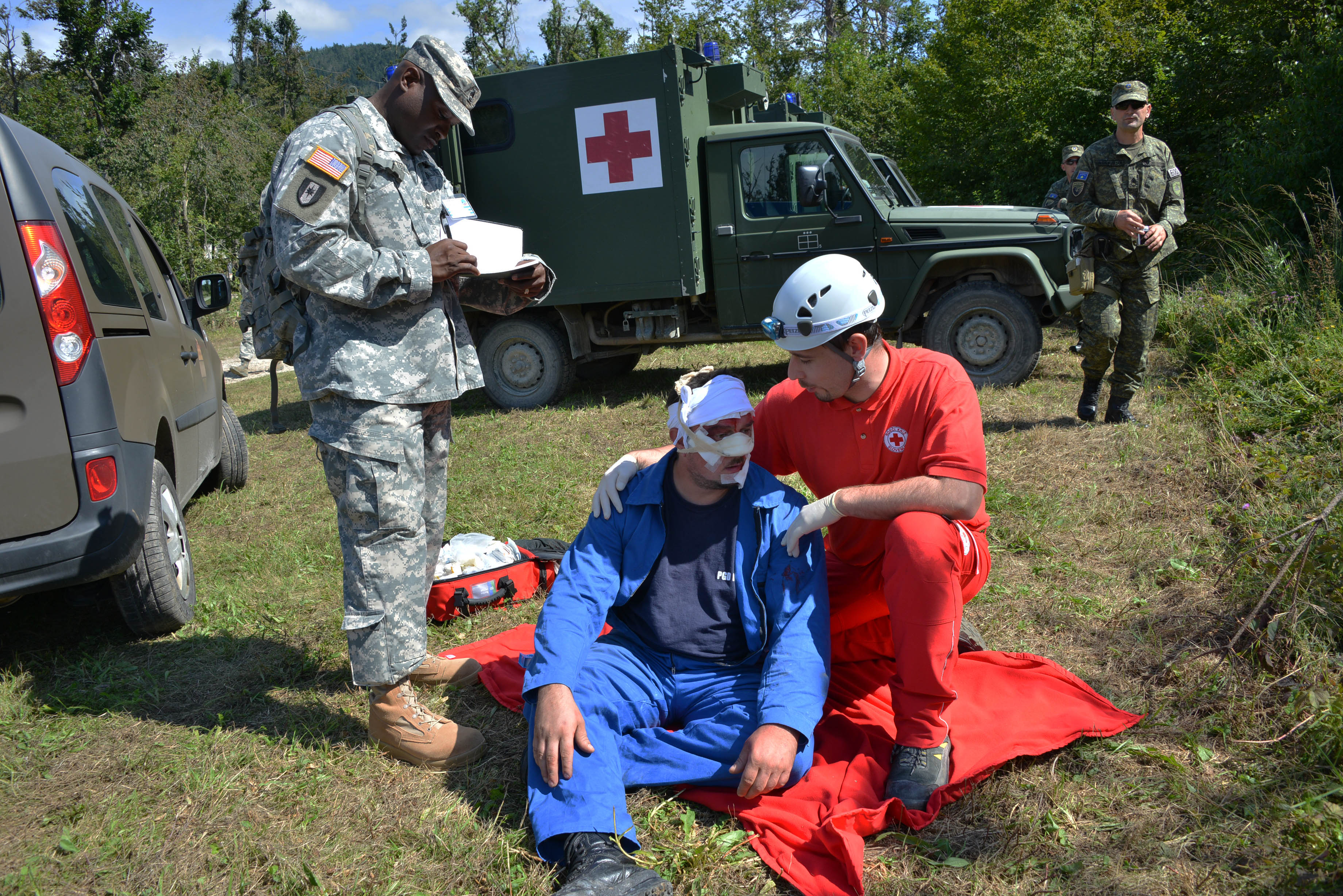
U.S. Army Sgt. 1st Class Ahmad Whitted, standing, an observer-controller, monitors the interaction between a role player and a Slovenian Civilian Protection agent Aug. 25, 2014, in Postojna, Slovenia

==== Tactical Combat Casualty Care (TC3) ====
Field medical training, or Tactical Combat Casualty Care training utilizes role-players to portray wounded soldiers and civilians on the battlefield. Role-players will often scream in pain, convulse, and panic to create extreme emotional conditions under which battle medics must operate proficiently. It is not uncommon for TC3 scenarios to employee amputees as role-players. These role-players are fitted with realistic prosthetic wounds that can gush synthetic blood or other bodily fluids in order to heighten the emotional intensity of a simulation. It is expected that trainees who are routinely exposed to such intense situations in simulations will eventually experience a level of "stress-inoculation" that will provide life-saving advantages in real battle situations.

=== Law Enforcement Training ===
Role-players are often hired by law enforcement agencies to portray criminals or victims of crimes in scenarios that simulate typical law enforcement situations. These can range from a response to a domestic violence call to an "active shooter" scenario. Role-players are advantageous over video-based police simulations in that they can escalate or de-escalate a confrontational situation in response to the words, body language, and tone of voice of the trainee. This becomes key in effective use-of-force training.

Law enforcement scenarios use role-players for scenarios such as interrogation, hostage negotiation, and witness interviews. Recently, law enforcement agencies have begun to introduce the identification of human trafficking victims into their role-player curriculum.

The Federal Law Enforcement Training Center at Glynco, Georgia, is the largest employer of non-military role-players in the United States.

=== Business Leadership Training ===
Role-players are used by businesses to equip their leadership with experience in handling interpersonal conflict, negotiations, interviews, performance reviews, customer service, workplace safety, and ethical dilemmas. A role-player may also simulate difficult and sensitive conversations such as layoffs. This gives leaders a chance to make mistakes in a safe environment.

=== Mediation and Facilitation Training ===
Role-playing is used to equip future practitioners with experience in using diverse skills, structures, and methods to handle various mediation and facilitation scenarios. These roleplays usually have students roleplaying both the mediation-facilitation and client-sides of the interactions; however, more intense or complicated scenarios can be explored with more experienced or professional role-players. The interactions are usually scaffolded; with various key features of the participants and situation defined, but much of the roleplay is improvised. The practice of roleplay in this context promotes several important factors, beyond basic skill-building. It fosters the capacity for multiperspectival thinking. It helps mediators and facilitators cultivate empathy and compassion for their clients, this cultivation can be critical for achieving better outcomes.

=== Forecasting ===
Role-play also has applications in forecasting. One forecasting method is to simulate the condition(s) being studied. A 2011 study by Kesten C. Green and J. Scott Armstrong compared role-thinking, in which individuals imagined other protagonists' perspectives, with role-play, in which participants adopted roles and interacted. Across nine conflicts, the role-play groups predicted decisions more accurately than participants using role-thinking.

== Learning advantages ==
The use of skilled role-players in a simulation has several benefits over using unskilled confederates:

- When untrained fellow learners are asked to serve as role-players in a simulation, the resulting learning experience tends to be ineffective due to embarrassment, intimidation, or unrealistic performances.
- Skilled role-players also help ensure the conditions for an effective simulation are intact. These conditions include maintaining a safe environment, and dynamically adjusting difficulty, complexity, and intensity to the capabilities and experience level of the learner.
- Since role-players improvise each interaction, predictability is taken out of the simulation. Predictable scenarios limit the development of decision-making skills.
- Role-player providers can typically offer broader coverage of demographic representation than is possible by using in-house staff to portray characters.

== Limitations ==
Role-players can be expensive to organizations with limited training resources. Role-player fees are typically contingent upon skill and level of specialized knowledge, and can range from minimum wage to more than US$100 per hour.

Certain types of training that require objectively quantifiable measures of success can be incompatible with the variability of using a human-in-the-loop.

== In fiction ==
=== The Diamond Age (novel) ===
Interactors feature prominently in Neal Stephenson's novel, The Diamond Age: Or, A Young Lady's Illustrated Primer.

Set in the near-future, artificial intelligence is depicted in the novel as having failed in its goal of creating software capable of passing the Turing Test, therefore it is renamed "pseudo-intelligence". As a result, virtual reality entertainments are augmented by role-players skilled in the use of digital puppetry who don motion capture suits and perform as interactive avatars within virtual environments. These human-in-the-loop simulations are known as "ractives" (an abbreviation of "interactives"), and the performers who drive them are called "ractors" (an abbreviation of "interactors").

=== The Game (film) ===
Ubiquitous and surreptitious role-players are the primary plot drivers of the 1997 film, The Game, directed by David Fincher. The protagonist agrees to participate in a vaguely defined game hosted by a high-end entertainment company called Consumer Recreation Services. He later ends up being manipulated by dozens of CSR role-players who psychologically torment him to the brink of suicide.

=== The Magus (novel) ===
In the John Fowles' novel, The Magus, an eccentric and wealthy recluse uses surreptitious role-players to manipulate the protagonist. The novel never fully clarifies which characters are "real", and which are being portrayed by actors. Additionally, there are role-players who engage with the protagonist as multiple different characters. He eventually loses the ability to distinguish artifice from reality, and realizes that he has become a fictionalized version of himself in the simulation of his own life.

== See also ==
- Business game
- Game (simulation)
- Hyperdrama
- Interactive theater
- Military simulation
- Presentational acting
- Serious game
- Simulation
