= Business simulation =

Simulation used for training or analysis

Business simulation or corporate simulation is business simulations used for training, education or analysis. It can be scenario-based or numeric-based.

Most business simulations are used for business acumen training and development. Learning objectives include: strategic thinking, decision making, problem solving, financial analysis, market analysis, operations, teamwork and leadership.

The business gaming community seems lately to have adopted the term business simulation game instead of just gaming or just simulation. The word simulation is sometimes considered too mechanistic for educational purposes. Simulation also refers to activities where an optimum for some problem is searched for, while this is not usually the aim of an educational game. On the other hand, the word game can imply time wasting, not taking things too seriously and engaging in an exercise designed purely for fun. The concept of simulation gaming seems to offer the right combination and balance between the two. Simulation gaming is also the term that the educational gaming community has adopted.

== Games and business simulation games ==
Partly, the terminology of business simulation games is not well established. The most common term used is business game but several other terms are also in use. Here we will define the most common terms used in context of (computer-based) business learning environments.

Klabbers (1999) notes that gaming is sometimes associated with something that is frivolous, just for the fun of it. This hampers its scientific endeavor and the more serious connotations of gaming in the scientific arena. The term game is used to describe activities in which some or all of these characteristics are prominent:

- Human, humanly controlled, opponents, whose actions have an effect upon each other and upon the environment,
- An emphasis on competitiveness and winning,
- An emphasis on pleasure, humour and enjoyment,
- A repetitive cycle of making decisions and encountering a result, allowing the hope of improvement and 'doing better next time'.

Games are played when one or more players compete or cooperate for payoffs, according to an agreed set of rules. Players behave as themselves though they may well display exceptional behavior. Games are social systems and they include actors (players), rules and resources, which are the basic building blocks of social systems. In each game, the players (actors) interact with one another, while applying different rules, and utilizing different resources.

Tsuchiya and Tsuchiya note that the simulation gaming community is still struggling to establish itself as a discipline, although 35 years have passed since the International Simulation and Gaming Association (ISAGA) was established. To be a discipline, simulation gaming needs a theory, methodology, and application and validation. Of these, forming a theory is the most difficult challenge. Similar comments come from Wolfe and Crookall. Referring to prior research they conclude that the educational simulation gaming field has been unable to create a generally accepted typology, let alone taxonomy, of the nature of simulation gaming. According to them this is unfortunate because the basis of any science is its ability to discriminate and classify phenomena within its purview, based on underlying theory and precepts. Without this, the field has been stuck, despite its age, at a relatively low level of development.

In most cases, the terms business (simulation) game and management (simulation) game can be used interchangeably and there is no well-established difference between these two terms. Greenlaw et al. determine a business game (or business simulation) as a sequential decision-making exercise structure around a model of a business operation, in which participants assume the role of managing the simulated operation. The descriptions given for a management game, for example, by Forrester and Naylor do not differ from the previous. However, Elgood determines that in a management game profit is not the dominant measure of success. Keys and Wolfe define a management game as a simplified simulated experiential environment that contains enough verisimilitude, or illusion of reality, to include real world-like responses by those participating in the exercise.

Gredler divides experiential simulations into the following four categories:

1. Data management simulations,
2. Diagnostic simulations,
3. Crisis management simulations, and
4. Social-process simulations.

Business simulation games are most often of the first kind. A participant in a data management simulation typically functions as a member of a team of managers or planners. Each team is managing a company allocating economic resources to any of several variables in order to achieve a particular goal.

Business strategy games are intended to enhance students' decision-making skills, especially under conditions defined by limited time and information. They vary in focus from how to undertake a corporate takeover to how to expand a company's share of the market. Typically, the player feeds information into a computer program and receives back a series of optional or additional data that are conditional upon the player's initial choices. The game proceeds through several series of these interactive, iterative steps. As can be noted, this definition does not consider continuous (real-time) processing an alternative.

In business simulation games players receive a description of an imaginary business and an imaginary environment and make decisions – on price, advertising, production targets, etc. – about how their company should be run. A business game may have an industrial, commercial or financial background (Elgood, 1996). Ju and Wagner mention that the nature of business games can include decision-making tasks, which pit the player against a hostile environment or hostile opponents. These simulations have a nature of strategy or war games, but usually are very terse in their user interface. Other types of managerial simulations are resource allocation games, in which the player or players have to allocate resources to areas such as plant, production, operations, marketing, and human resources, in order to produce and sell goods.

According to Senge and Lannon in managerial microworlds – like business simulation games – unlike in the actual world, managers are free to experiment with policies and strategies without fear of jeopardizing the company. This process includes the kind of reflection and inquiry for which there is no time in the hectic everyday world. Thus, Senge and Lannon argue, managers learn about the long-term, systemic consequences of their actions. Such "virtual worlds" are particularly important in team learning. Managers can learn to think systemically if they can uncover the subtle interactions that thwart their efforts.

Naylor in 1971 gives quite a detailed view of the contents, structure, and operating of management games. Today, this description by Naylor is still valid for most of the business simulation games. Business simulation games are built around a hypothetical oligopolistic industry consisting of three to six firms, whose decision-makers or managers are the participants of the game. Each firm or team is allocated a specific amount of resources in the form of cash, inventories, raw materials, plant and equipment, and so forth. Before each operating period the players make decisions. Naylor mentions that these decisions can concern, e.g., price, output, advertising, marketing, raw material acquisition, changes in plant capacity, and wage rate. This information is read into a computer that has been programmed on the basis of a set of mathematical models that provide a link between the operating results and operating decisions of the individual firms, as well as the external environment (the market). On the basis of (a) a set of behavioral equations, such as demand and cost functions, and a set of accounting formulas that have been programmed into the computer, and (b) the individual decisions of each firm, operating results are generated by the computer in the form of printed reports – for example, profit and loss statements, balance sheets, production reports, sales reports, and total industry reports – at the end of each operating period. Usually the environment can be changed by the administrator of the game by altering the parameters of the operating characteristics of the game. In each case, the firms find it necessary to react according to the magnitude and the nature of the change imposed by the external environment. Naylor mentions that some of the more complicated and more realistic games even permit multiple products, plants, and marketing areas, stochastic production periods, stochastic demand, labor negotiations, and the sale of common stock. For more information about this topic see Lainema (2003).

== History ==
The first use of games for education and development was the war game simulations in China in about 3,000 B.C. These games bore a vague similarity to the early 17th century chess. In the Western world, war games date back to at least the German Kriegspiel of the mid-nineteenth century (Faria and Dickinson). Faria and Dickinson note that different war games have also been conducted in Japan before the Second World War and war games have been long used by the British and the Americans to test battle strategies. Military officers trained with war games in the 1930s and 1940s started to use their military training to manage civilian businesses. Some of the business game evolution can be traced to a 1955 Rand Corporation game, which simulated the U.S. Air Force inventory management within its supply system. Greenlaw et al. state that business simulation exercises may be considered an outgrowth of earlier developments in three fields: military war gaming, operations research, and educational role-playing.

According to Naylor, the use of games in business and economics goes back to 1956 when the American Management Association developed the first so-called management decision-making game, called the Top Management Decision Game. Faria and Dickinson and Greenlaw et al. also find this the first widely known business decision-making simulation, although Greenlaw et al. date the origin of the game to 1957 and further specify that it was the first non-military competitive business game. Greenlaw et al. note that the Top Management Decision Simulation stimulated the design and use of dozens of other games. In this simulation five teams of players operated firms competing in a hypothetical, one-product industry. Teams made quarterly decisions covering price, production volume, budgets, research and development, advertising, and sales force and could request selected marketing research information. During the period 1955-1957 only one or two new games appeared each year (Faria, 1990).

A rapid growth in the number of business games occurred over the years from 1958 to 1961. Greenlaw et al. had made a summary of some business games available by the beginning of the 1960s. The summary includes 89 different business games or different versions of a certain business game developed by industrial firms, business associations, educational institutes, or governmental units. Naylor mentions already in 1971 that hundreds of management games have been developed by various universities, business firms, and research organizations. These management games have been used both for research purposes and for training people in diverse disciplines such as management, business operation, economics, organization theory, psychology, production management, finance, accounting, and marketing. Also Faria (1990) and Dickinson note that the number of simulation games grew rapidly in the 1960s. McRaith and Goeldner list 29 marketing games, of which 20 had been developed by business firms and nine by academians for university teaching. In 1969 Graham and Gray listed nearly 200 business games of different varieties. Horn and Cleaves provided a description of 228 business games. Faria (1989) mentions that over 200 simulations were in use in the United States in over 1,700 business schools. Overall, taking advantage of computer games in education increased enormously through the 1960s to the 1980s, see for example Ju and Wagner.

At the end of the 1980s Faria (1990) estimated that there were approximately 228 games available in the United States, and that there were around 8,500 instructors using business games. At that point, Faria also believes that there is a large and growing number of business schools instructors and business firm users of simulation games. Still, Faria estimated that only 12.5% of all US business firms with training and development managers used computerized business games.

The penetration of business gaming in academia is fuelled by the following factors: the increase in student numbers, the increase in new courses, increased adoption of methods supporting diverse learning styles, and the increasing availability of technology. Dickinson and Faria state that in US over 200 business games are being used by nearly 9,000 teachers at over 1,700 colleges offering business programmes.

Larsen and Lomi describe the shift of the objectives of management gaming. They state that until the early 1980s simulation was used to forecast the behavior of a variety of sub-system level variables, ranging from the cash flow and financial performance of a company, to the inflation and unemployment rates of an economy. They state further, that during the last 15 years a new way of thinking about simulation emerged. Instead of focusing on predicting, simulation progressively became a tool to help management teams understand their company and industry's problems and opportunities. Simulations could prepare for the future and reduce the sensitivity of possible strategies to changes in alternative frames of reference – or mental models. Larsen and Lomi further note, that the emphasis of computer-based simulation models has shifted:

1. from predicting the future, to understanding how multiple possible futures might be linked to decisions and actions that must be taken today, and
2. from designing the best strategy, to analyzing how robust our preferred strategy would be under different assumptions about how the future might unfold, or about how the past actually produced the events that we perceive.

In the late 1990s, training and consulting companies began designing and customizing business simulations for individual companies to augment their corporate leadership development programs. The business simulations often focused on strategy and business acumen. The business simulations allowed participants to test their decision-making skills, make mistakes, and safely learn from their experience. Some refer to this type of employee education as "experiential learning". By 2000, business simulations were available that blended the traditional business acumen (financial) skills with the softer – interpersonal – skills required for effective leadership development.

== Scenario simulations ==
In a business game or business simulation game, a scenario is played out in a simulated environment and the learner or user is asked to make individual or team based decisions on how to act in the simulations. Often multiple choice alternatives are used and the scenario is played out following a branching tree based on which decisions the learner makes. Throughout or at certain intervals feedback is provided. These are similar to role-play simulations.

== Numeric simulations ==
A numeric simulation can mimic a whole company on a high level or it can be more detailed and mimic specific organizational units or processes. In a numeric simulation the learner or user makes decisions by pulling levers and dialers as well as through inputting numbers. The decisions are processed and the outcomes are calculated and shown in reports and graphs, e.g. price and volume as well as number of employees can be decisions and the outcome can be viewed in e.g. an income statement, a balance sheet and a cash flow statement. Feedback is given throughout the simulation or at certain intervals, such as when a year has passed. Many numeric business simulations include elements of competition against other participants or against computer generated competitors.

== Types of business simulation games ==
Business simulation games can be classified according to several properties. The first taxonomies were introduced already in the beginning of the 1960s (see e.g. Greenlaw et al., 1962). Here we introduce the taxonomy from Biggs, which is practically identical with the taxonomy from Greenlaw et al.

Dimension	Description of alternatives
Functional or Total enterprise	Designed to focus specifically on problems of decision-making as seen in one functional area; OR Designed to give participants experience in making decisions at a top executive level and in which decisions from one functional area interact with those made in other areas of a firm.
Competitive or Non-competitive	Whether the decisions or participants influence the results of other participants or not.
Interactive or Noninteractive	In an interactive game participants respond to the questions at the computer, receive an immediate response, and then submit additional decisions. In a noninteractive game decisions are submitted to the game administrator.
Industry specific or Generic	In an industry specific game the authors attempt to replicate closely the actual industry. In generic games only general business relationships are replicated.
Played by Individuals or by Teams	
Deterministic or Stochastic	The stochastic alternative is probabilistic, including chance elements.
Degree of complexity	Two dimensions of complexity: (a) game decision input variable complexity, (b) the computer model complexity
The time period simulated	E.g. day/week/quarter/year

== The simulation gaming process ==
Business simulation games are designed to provide a sandbox learning environments. When arguing for this, they most often refer to David A. Kolb's influential work in the field of experiential learning. During the last decades ideas from constructivism and authentic e-learning have also provided new perspectives for considering the role of business simulations in learning. The activities carried out during a simulation game training session are:

- Theoretical instruction: The teacher goes through certain relevant aspects of a theory and participants can intervene with questions and comments.
- Introduction to the game: The participants are told how to operate the computer and how to play the game.
- Playing the game: Participants get the opportunity to practice their knowledge and skills by changing different parameters of the game and reflecting on the possible consequences of these changes. Permanent contact with the participants is advisable, as well as keeping the training going to maintain a positive atmosphere and to secure that the participants feel engaged.
- Group discussions: Each of the participants is given a possibility to present and compare their results from the game with the results of others. The participants are encouraged to present their results to others. The teacher should continually look for new ways of enriching the discussions and to help the participants to find the connection between the game results and the problems in real world. The quality of this group discussion plays a relevant role in the training as it will affect the participants' transfer of knowledge and skills into the real world.

=== Introduction to the Game ===
Instructors may vary in how much introduction they give to a business simulation game. The level of preliminary instruction given may also vary depending on the complexity of the simulation.

Business simulations may be played by individuals or by teams. Increasing team size allows for practical lessons in leadership and collaboration and students delegate responsibilities, interpret data, and make decisions. Research indicates that team performance rises with each additional member until the team reaches five members.

=== Group Discussions ===
The group discussion phase is usually called debriefing. Debriefing is the most important part of the simulation/gaming experience. We all learn from experience, but without reflecting on this experience the learning potential may be lost. Simulation gaming needs to be seen as contrived experiences in the learning cycle, which require special attention at the stages of reflection and generalization.

Thiagarajan lists six phases of debriefing, presented as a flexible suggestion and not as rigid requirements:

1. How do you feel? Gives the participants an opportunity to get some of their strong feelings about the simulation game off their chest.
2. What happened? Makes it possible for the participants to compare and to contrast participant recollections and to draw some general conclusions during the next phase.
3. What did you learn? Encourage the generation and testing of different hypotheses. Ask the participants to come up with general principles based on their experiences from the game and to offer evidence to support or to reject the principles.
4. How does this relate to the real world? Encourage a discussion of the relevance of the game to the participants' real world workplace.
5. What if…? Encourage the participants to apply their insights to new contexts.
6. What next? Participants use their insights to come up with strategies for the simulation game and for the workplace.

Van Ments notes that the aim of debriefing is to: deal with factual errors and to tie up loose ends (including scoring); draw out general conclusions about the session; and deduce general lessons which can be extrapolated to the real world. Furthermore, the participants should not be allowed to conclude what was learned without receiving feedback (Gentry, 1990). The participants need to articulate their perception of what was learned, and the instructor needs to put things into a broader perspective. Gentry also expresses that process feedback is much more valuable than outcome feedback. As games are less-than-perfect representations of the real world, it should be the decision process used that needs to be applauded or critiqued, not the gaming outcome. The importance of reflection, debriefing and feedback highlight the need for business simulations to supported by carefully considered learning outcomes, pedagogy and assessment tasks. Student factors such as low motivation to engage and prior skill weaknesses can undermine the ability of authentic assessment regimes to achieve the purported learning benefits. The Online Business Simulations Project funded by the Australian Government Office for Learning and Teaching has developed a range of resources to help educators embed simulations into their classes.

=== Cognitive assessment of market awareness ===
A study in the Journal of Business Research used a Marketplace Simulations game to explore the role of cognitive processes in team decision-making within the context of marketing. The paper addressed a gap in existing literature by considering not only behavioral and cultural aspects but also the cognitive aspects of information processing in teams. The team gathered data from eight MBA programs across the United States that used Marketplace Simulations in their class. The final study included 823 participants, representing 179 MBA teams. After the fourth decision round in the simulation, students were told to create a detailed business plan for the remaining four decision rounds. They were then given an assessment to measure their perceptions of the market, the symmetry of the team's awareness, team tactical agreement, and team performance. Researchers controlled for how many years of real-world work experience each team member had, as well as how much time each one had spent in the simulation.

The study's results showed that when a management team can perceive, understand, and predict market factors (team market awareness), the company tends to perform better. This effect is even stronger when awareness among team members is uneven, with some having a better grasp of certain market elements. Additionally, when team members agree on how to approach different aspects of marketing, the impact of team market awareness on performance is even greater.

== See also ==
- Marketing simulation game
- Project management simulation
- Simulations and games in economics education
- Training simulation
