= Print simulation =

Print process simulation uses interactive simulation software to reproduce the operating conditions of complex multi-colour printing presses that often cost several million dollars. Simulators are available for different printing process technologies (offset Sseetfed, heatset and coldset web offset, flexographic and gravure packaging), and include their consumables (like inks, plates, paper and other substrates) and where pertinent, in-line packaging operations (such as folding, cutting, and label creation).

== Simulation in education and training ==
Press operators get hands-on experience in quality control and problem solving, without the costs, dangers, or unstructured training associated with learning on actual presses. A wide variety of printing conditions and problems are covered that are used for training, skills assessment, performance enhancement, and process analysis. Simulation is a means of presenting infrequent problems before they happen, so that they can be recognized when they do occur. Exercises can evaluate specific competencies and if they are used to solve problems. the NAA (Newspaper Association of America), and the Flexographic Technical Association.

== Printing simulation ==
Typical systems include monitoring and cost analysis that allow the training process to correlate with, versus the waste, cost, and time on a real press. Simulators may be connected to a press control console (like the cockpit in a flight simulator) or run on standard micro computer hardware with single or multiple screens. Internet-based learning management systems now allow simulation exercises to be made in a one language/location and reviewed in another language by a training supervisor in a different location – what is traced is the interaction with the process, not the local name of the controls.

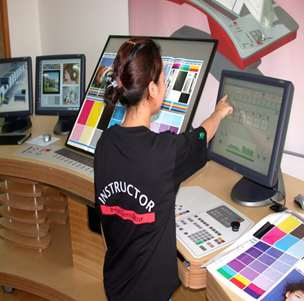
A print simulator integrated into a real press control console. The different screens show (from left to right): 1. the pressroom (access to the machine and environment); 2. the printed copy: high contrast, small display; 3. the printed copy: lower contract, large display; 4. a real operator interface to a process control system

As of 2013, it was estimated that over 2000 print simulators were installed worldwide. Users include technical schools, universities, printing companies, and their suppliers, who find that they cut costs, accelerate training time, and give a more thorough grounding in structured problem solving.

Simulators from Sinapse are used alongside real presses in the EuroSkills and WorldSkills competitions to select the best printer.

In 2013, the print simulation cloud-based learning system DLMS won a PIA (Printing Industries of America) Intertech Award: Language-independent, it automatically analysed and compares training results from different countries, in different languages. This DLMS was used at worldskillsLeipzig 2013 to analyze and compare results from contestants using simulators in more than ten languages.
