= Tijdschrift voor Gerontologie en Geriatrie =

- Discipline: Gerontology, geriatrics
- Language: Dutch

Publication details
- Former name(s): Nederlands Tijdschrift voor Gerontologie, Gerontologie
- History: 1970-present
- Publisher: Vilans / Performis
- Frequency: Bimonthly

Standard abbreviations
- ISO 4: Tijdschr. Gerontol. Geriatr.

Indexing
- ISSN: 0167-9228 (print); 1875-6832 (web)
- OCLC no.: 1070885309

Links
- Journal homepage; Online archive

The Tijdschrift voor Gerontologie en Geriatrie (English: Journal for Gerontology and Geriatrics) is a bimonthly peer-reviewed medical journal covering gerontology and geriatrics. It was established in 1970 as the Nederlands Tijdschrift voor Gerontologie and renamed Gerontologie in 1980 before obtaining its current name in 1982. It is published by Performis / Vilans.

== Abstracting and indexing ==
The journal is abstracted and indexed in:

- EBSCO databases
- Embase
- Index Medicus/MEDLINE/PubMed
- ProQuest databases
- PsycINFO
- Scopus
