= Training simulation =

Virtual medium through which various types of skills can be acquired

In business, training simulation (also known as simulation-based training) is a virtual medium through which various types of skills can be acquired. Training simulations can be used in a variety of genres; however they are most commonly used in corporate situations to improve business awareness and management skills. They are also common in academic environments as an integrated part of a business or management course.

The word "simulation" implies an imitation of a real-life process, usually via a computer or other technological device, in order to provide a lifelike experience. This has proven to be a reliable and successful method of training in thousands of industries worldwide. They can be used both to allow specialization in a certain area, and to educate individuals in the workings of the sectors as a whole, making training simulations versatile. Training simulations are not just games; their aim is to educate and inform in an exciting and memorable way, rather than purely to entertain.

== Purpose ==
Companies across the world regularly use simulations as a tool to teach employees. With the enormous range of simulation-based activities available, it is unsurprising that the specific aims of the sessions vary widely. Some simulations are focused on making decisions in a particular area of the business, such as personnel or product design, and these are called Functional Simulations. Others give a general overview of a company and give experience of making executive management decisions, and are called Total Enterprise Simulations. In recent years, however, this classification has become somewhat impractical, as increasing numbers of training simulations are involving both elements, and combining both an overall view of the industry with some decisions relating to specific sectors.

Training Simulations normally form part of a program designed to educate employees or students about the skills needed to operate a business, as well as persuade them to "think outside the box" and see the bigger picture. This can make for a better organized, more fluid system in which all employees understand their part in making the company successful.

Although the most common use for training simulations is in a corporate setting, simulation games are increasingly being used to educate young people about the importance of business. From secondary school age all the way up to MBA students, anyone can benefit from the first-hand experience of running a company and making decisions that directly affect performance. This will allow the participants to gain an overall understanding of the business world, and give some insight into the type of skills that are necessary to succeed. It is also important to note that 'beating the game' should not be a primary aim for anyone taking part in a simulation; the focus should be directed towards everyone gaining some useful and relevant knowledge that they can take away and use in their daily lives. If the simulation does have a competitive element, it is to motivate and inspire, rather than encourage any malpractice. Some training activities are non-competitive to avoid this, however many noted experts in the field state that the rivalry between teams or individuals improves the learning experience and adds a sense of fun and drama into the simulation. This is particularly important when working with young people such as students, as they often require an extra boost to keep them entertained, especially when a simulation is run over an extended period.

== Development ==
The concept of training employees to have a wider perspective on their position within the workplace has been around for hundreds of years, but it is only relatively recently that the idea of creating a simulated environment for trainees to test their abilities and skills has been developed. The first commercially available training simulation was in 1956, and was called The Top Management Decision Game, and was created by the American Management Association. Since then, the market has expanded hugely, with thousands of simulations available based upon hundreds of different industries. Initially simple with just a few choices to make, some simulations have become extremely complex with many different interlinking decisions. When training simulations were first used, they involved paper forms that were filled in by the participants and then compared by the organizer of the exercise. Nowadays, nearly all simulations are computer based, and involve multi-stage algorithms that calculate performance based on the decisions entered. Most simulations are based around a real industry, and hence they use real data to be as accurate as possible and to provide a realistic experience. However, some remain generic and do not model a particular industry, although these tend to be more useful for younger players or those with absolutely no business knowledge.

== Integrated ==
Most corporations and academic courses that contain a training simulation integrate it into an existing or completely new training programme. This allows the participants to get the maximum value from the experience, as well as review the sessions in order to improve them for future use. The structure of a training session would normally be as follows:

- Introduction: the organizer of the program (plus sometimes a specialist in the training simulation) will meet the participants and give them a brief explanation of the purposes behind the training and what they should hope to achieve.
- Lectures: sometimes the trainees will also receive one or more lectures around the topics that the simulation will be based on, in order to give them an idea of the type of skills they will need. This is especially important within academia, when the students will often be examined on this section after the event.
- The simulation: the simulation will then be played, allowing newly acquired knowledge to be tested and skills practiced. A positive atmosphere is vital here to maintain enthusiasm.
- Evaluation: once the simulation has been completed, it is important to summarize what has been learnt and the effectiveness of the training. Presenting results to others may provide a means of internal assessment, as well as showcasing the players’ achievements.

This integrated training will allow everyone taking part in the simulation to get the maximum experience possible, as well as being entertaining, exciting and giving them a new perspective on the business world. Many companies that specialize in training simulations also offer to create a special integrated plan unique to the client, to make the process as streamlined and efficient as possible.

== Benefits ==
Since training simulations are available based on such a wide range of different industries, and with thousands of different aims and objectives, it is difficult to outline a specific skill-set that will be improved by taking part in a training simulation. However, skills that good training simulations should build on include:

- Business awareness – before participating in the training programme, many players will have little idea of how to run a business or what it involves. Simulations allow them to temporarily have control over a virtual company, to see whether their decisions lead them to success or failure!
- Time management and organization – most simulations contain timed sessions, which will test the candidates’ skill in submitting decisions within the allotted time slot. This is an excellent skill for any employee or graduate.
- Team coordination – the majority of training simulations involve working in groups or teams of people; improving the abilities to communicate effectively, delegate tasks and diplomatically resolve any situations. This concept can extend beyond office-based occupations, and is frequently used in public safety contexts.
- Problem solving – simulations will often present tricky circumstances that must be thought through logically to be solved. Successful resolution of these shows good management skills.

If every participant improves in these four key skill areas, the training programme will be a success, and any business should notice an improvement in efficiency and motivation, and students will be inspired and animated.

== See also ==
- Business game
- Business simulation
- Business simulation game
- Experiential learning
- Friday Night at the ER
- Microsoft Flight Simulator
- Print simulation
- Project management simulation
- Simulations and games in economics education
- Simulations and games in industry education
- Web-based simulation
