= Experiential learning =

Theory and philosophy of learning

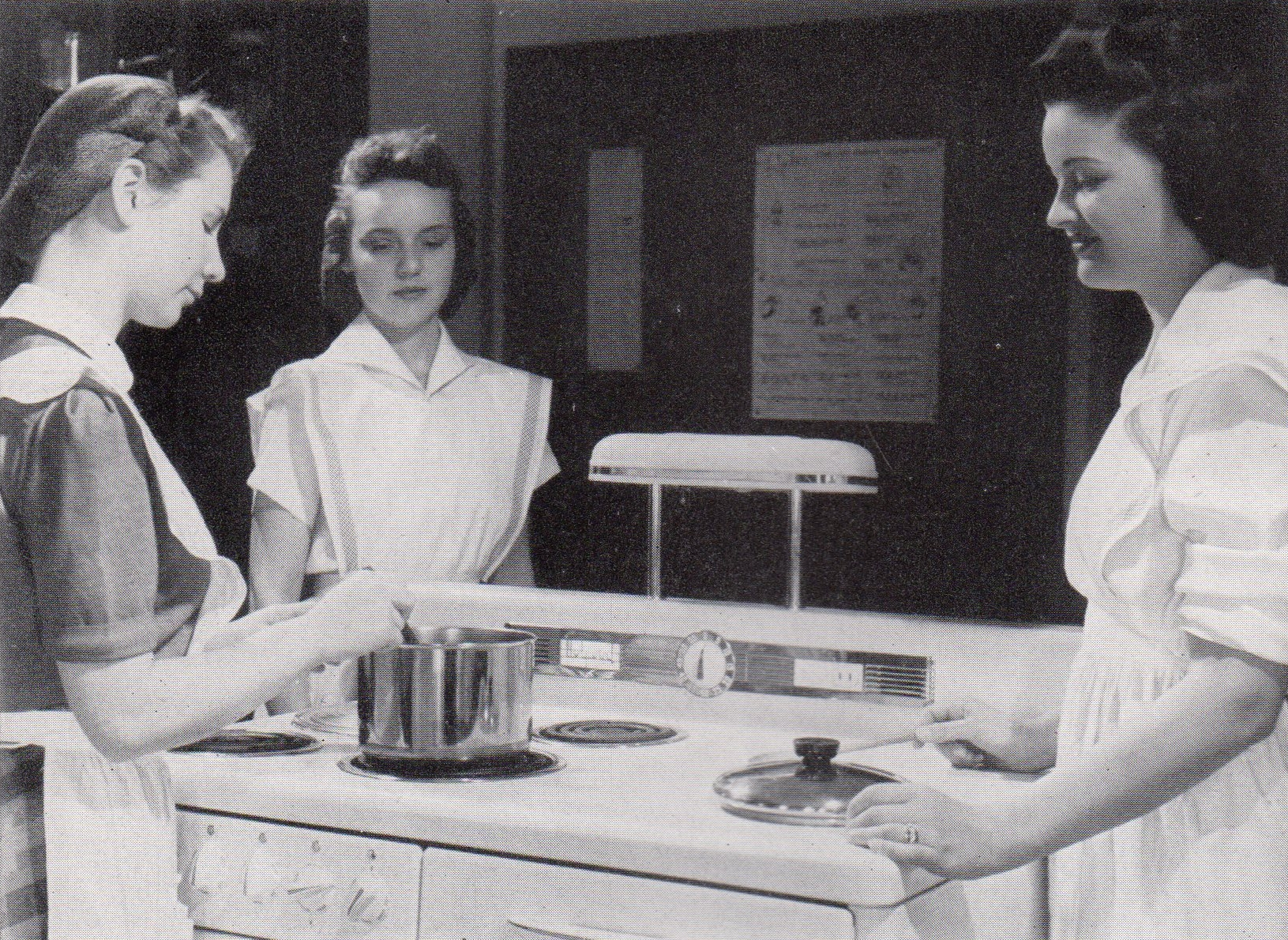
Shimer College students learning to cook by cooking, 1942

Experiential learning (ExL) is the process of learning through experience, and is more narrowly defined as "learning through reflection on doing". Hands-on learning can be a form of experiential learning, but does not necessarily involve students reflecting on their product. Experiential learning is distinct from rote or didactic learning, in which the learner plays a comparatively passive role. It is related to, but not synonymous with, other forms of active learning such as action learning, adventure learning, free-choice learning, cooperative learning, service-learning, and situated learning.

Experiential learning is often used synonymously with the term "experiential education", but while experiential education is a broader philosophy of education, experiential learning considers the individual learning process. As such, compared to experiential education, experiential learning is concerned with more concrete issues related to the learner and the learning context. Experiences "stick out" in the mind and assist with information retention.

The general concept of learning through experience is ancient. Around 350 BC, Aristotle wrote in the Nicomachean Ethics "for the things we have to learn before we can do them, we learn by doing them". But as an articulated educational approach, experiential learning is of much more recent origin. Beginning in the 1970s, David A. Kolb helped develop the modern theory of experiential learning, drawing heavily on the work of John Dewey, Kurt Lewin, and Jean Piaget.

Experiential learning has significant teaching advantages. Peter Senge, author of The Fifth Discipline (1990), states that teaching is of utmost importance to motivate people. Learning only has good effects when learners have the desire to absorb the knowledge. Therefore, experiential learning requires the showing of directions for learners.

Experiential learning entails a hands-on approach to learning that moves away from just the teacher at the front of the room imparting and transferring their knowledge to students. It makes learning an experience that moves beyond the classroom and strives to bring a more involved way of learning.

== Kolb's experiential learning model ==
Experiential learning focuses on the learning process for the individual. One example of experiential learning is going to the zoo and learning through observation and interaction with the zoo environment, as opposed to reading about animals from a book. Thus, one makes discoveries and experiments with knowledge firsthand, instead of hearing or reading about others' experiences. Likewise, in business school, internship, and job-shadowing, opportunities in a student's field of interest can provide valuable experiential learning which contributes significantly to the student's overall understanding of the real-world environment.

A third example of experiential learning involves learning how to ride a bike, a process which can illustrate the four-step experiential learning model (ELM) as set forth by Kolb and outlined in Figure 1 below. Following this example, in the "concrete experience" stage, the learner physically interacts with the bike in the "here and now". This experience forms "the basis for observation and reflection" and the learner has the opportunity to consider what is working or failing (reflective observation), formulate a generalized theory or idea about riding a bike in general (abstract conceptualization) and to think about ways to improve on the next attempt made at riding (active experimentation). Every new attempt to ride is informed by a cyclical pattern of previous experience, thought and reflection.

Figure 1 – David Kolb's Experiential Learning Model (ELM)

	⮣	Concrete Experience	⮧
Active Experimentation				Reflective Observation
	⮤	Abstract Conceptualization	⮠

=== Elements ===
Experiential learning can occur without a teacher and relates solely to the meaning-making process of the individual's direct experience. However, though the gaining of knowledge is an inherent process that occurs naturally, a genuine learning experience requires certain elements. According to Kolb, knowledge is continuously gained through both personal and environmental experiences. Kolb states that in order to gain genuine knowledge from an experience, the learner must have four abilities:

- The learner must be willing to be actively involved in the experience;
- The learner must be able to reflect on the experience;
- The learner must possess and use analytical skills to conceptualize the experience; and
- The learner must possess decision making and problem solving skills in order to use the new ideas gained from the experience.

== Implementation ==
Experiential learning requires self-initiative, an "intention to learn" and an "active phase of learning". Kolb's cycle of experiential learning can be used as a framework for considering the different stages involved. Jennifer A. Moon has elaborated on this cycle to argue that experiential learning is most effective when it involves: 1) a "reflective learning phase" 2) a phase of learning resulting from the actions inherent to experiential learning, and 3) "a further phase of learning from feedback". This process of learning can result in "changes in judgment, feeling or skills" for the individual and can provide direction for the "making of judgments as a guide to choice and action".

Most educators understand the important role experience plays in the learning process. The role of emotion and feelings in learning from experience has been recognised as an important part of experiential learning. While those factors may improve the likelihood of experiential learning occurring, it can occur without them. Rather, what is vital in experiential learning is that the individual is encouraged to directly involve themselves in the experience, and then to reflect on their experiences using analytic skills, in order that they gain a better understanding of the new knowledge and retain the information for a longer time.

Reflection is a crucial part of the experiential learning process, and like experiential learning itself, it can be facilitated or independent. Dewey wrote that "successive portions of reflective thought grow out of one another and support one another", creating a scaffold for further learning, and allowing for further experiences and reflection. This reinforces the fact that experiential learning and reflective learning are iterative processes, and the learning builds and develops with further reflection and experience. Facilitation of experiential learning and reflection is challenging, but "a skilled facilitator, asking the right questions and guiding reflective conversation before, during, and after an experience, can help open a gateway to powerful new thinking and learning". Jacobson and Ruddy, building on Kolb's four-stage Experiential Learning Model and Pfeiffer and Jones's five stage Experiential Learning Cycle, took these theoretical frameworks and created a simple, practical questioning model for facilitators to use in promoting critical reflection in experiential learning. Their "5 Questions" model is as follows:

- Did you notice?
- Why did that happen?
- Does that happen in life?
- Why does that happen?
- How can you use that?

These questions are posed by the facilitator after an experience, and gradually lead the group towards a critical reflection on their experience, and an understanding of how they can apply the learning to their own life. Although the questions are simple, they allow a relatively inexperienced facilitator to apply the theories of Kolb, Pfeiffer, and Jones, and deepen the learning of the group.

While it is the learner's experience that is most important to the learning process, it is also important not to forget the wealth of experience a good facilitator also brings to the situation. However, while a facilitator, or "teacher", may improve the likelihood of experiential learning occurring, a facilitator is not essential to experiential learning. Rather, the mechanism of experiential learning is the learner's reflection on experiences using analytic skills. This can occur without the presence of a facilitator, meaning that experiential learning is not defined by the presence of a facilitator. Yet, by considering experiential learning in developing course or program content, it provides an opportunity to develop a framework for adapting varying teaching/learning techniques into the classroom.

== In schools ==
Experiential learning is supported in different school organizational models and learning environments.

- Hyper Island is a global, constructivist school originally from Sweden, with a range of school and executive education programs grounded in experience-based learning, and with reflection taught as key skill to learn for life.
- THINK Global School is a four-year traveling high school that holds classes in a new country each term. Students engage in experiential learning through activities such as workshops, cultural exchanges, museum tours, and nature expeditions.
- In the ELENA-Project, the follow-up project of "animals live", experiential learning with living animals will be developed. Together with project partners from Romania, Hungary and Georgia, the Bavarian Academy of Nature Conservation and Landscape Management in Germany brings living animals in the lessons of European schools. The aim is to brief children for the context of the biological diversity and to support them to develop ecologically oriented values.
- Loving High School in Loving, New Mexico, publishes career and technical education opportunities for students. These include internship for students who are interested in science, STEM majors, or architecture. The school is making good connections with local businesses, which helps students get used to working in such environments.
- The Work Experience Builders project connect work to learning by helping students gain real-world work experience and experiential knowledge within a mentored project-based learning environment.
- Chicago Public Schools operates eight early college STEM high schools through its Early College STEM School Initiative. The eight high schools offer four-years of computer science classes to every student. Additionally, students are able to earn college credits from local community colleges. Each school partners with a technology company which offers students internships and mentors from the company to expose students to jobs in STEM fields.
- Robert H. Smith School of Business offers select undergraduate students a year-round advanced course whereby students conduct financial analyses and security trades to manage real investment dollars in the Lemma Senbet Fund.
- Nonprofits such as Out Teach, Life Lab, Nature Explore, and the National Wildlife Federation, provide training for teachers on how to use outdoor spaces for experiential learning.
- Many European schools take part in intercultural educational programs, such as the European Youth Parliament, which uses experience-based learning to promote intercultural understanding among young students, through indoor and outdoor activities, discussions and debates.

== In business education ==
As higher education continues to adapt to new expectations from students, experiential learning in business and accounting programs has become more important. For example, Clark & White (2010) point out that "a quality university business education program must include an experiential learning component". With reference to this study, employers note that graduating students need to build skills in "professionalism" – which can be taught via experiential learning. Students value this learning as much as industry.

Learning styles also impact business education in the classroom. Kolb positions four learning styles, Diverger, Assimilator, Accommodator and Converger, atop the Experiential Learning Model, using the four experiential learning stages to carve out "four quadrants", one for each learning style. An individual's dominant learning style can be identified by taking Kolb's Learning Style Inventory (LSI). More recent researchers have argued that learning styles are a neuromyth, and that categorising learners according to styles is unhelpful and inaccurate.

Robert Loo (2002) undertook a meta-analysis of 8 studies which revealed that Kolb's learning styles were not equally distributed among business majors in the sample. More specifically, results indicated that there appears to be a high proportion of assimilators and a lower proportion of accommodators than expected for business majors. Not surprisingly, within the accounting sub-sample there was a higher proportion of convergers and a lower proportion of accommodators. Similarly, in the finance sub-sample, a higher proportion of assimilators and lower proportion of divergers was apparent. Within the marketing sub-sample there was an equal distribution of styles. This would provide some evidence to suggest that while it is useful for educators to be aware of common learning styles within business and accounting programs, they should be encouraging students to use all four learning styles appropriately and students should use a wide range of learning methods.

Professional education applications, also known as management training or organizational development, apply experiential learning techniques in training employees at all levels within the business and professional environment. Interactive, role-play based customer service training is often used in large retail chains. Training board games simulating business and professional situations such as the Beer Distribution Game used to teach supply chain management, and the Friday Night at the ER game used to teach systems thinking, are used in business training efforts.

== In business ==
Experiential business learning is the process of learning and developing business skills through the medium of shared experience. The main point of difference between this and academic learning is more “real-life” experience for the recipient.

This may include for example, learning gained from a network of business leaders sharing best practice, or individuals being mentored or coached by a person who has faced similar challenges and issues, or simply listening to an expert or thought leader in current business thinking.

Providers of this type of experiential business learning often include membership organisations who offer product offerings such as peer group learning, professional business networking, expert/speaker sessions, mentoring and/or coaching.

== Comparisons ==
Experiential learning is most easily compared with academic learning, the process of acquiring information through the study of a subject without the necessity for direct experience. While the dimensions of experiential learning are analysis, initiative, and immersion, the dimensions of academic learning are constructive learning and reproductive learning. Though both methods aim to instill new knowledge in the learner, academic learning does so through more abstract, classroom-based techniques, whereas experiential learning actively involves the learner in a concrete experience.

== Benefits ==
- Experience real world: For example, students who major in Chemistry may have chances to interact with the chemical environment. Learners who have a desire to become businesspeople will have the opportunity to experience the manager position.
- Improved on-the-job performance: A 2015 study of bus drivers found that simulator-based eco-driving training improved workplace fuel economy, with improvements still observed six months after training.
- Opportunities for creativity: There is always more than one solution for a problem in the real world. Students will have a better chance to learn that lesson when they get to interact with real life experiences.

== See also ==
=== People ===
- Jean Marc Gaspard Itard
- Édouard Séguin
- Johann Heinrich Pestalozzi
- Friedrich Fröbel
- David Manson -- Irish educator, advocate for play and peer tutoring (1726-1792).
- John Dewey – American philosopher, psychologist, and activist (1859–1952)
- Paulo Freire – Brazilian educator (1921–1997)
- Kurt Hahn – German educator (1886–1974)
- David A. Kolb – American educational theorist (born 1939)
- Maria Montessori – Italian physician and educator (1870–1952)
- Jean Piaget – Swiss psychologist (1896–1980)
- Carl Rogers – American psychologist (1902–1987)
- Rudolf Steiner – Austrian esotericist (1861–1925)
- Emile Jaques-Dalcroze - Swiss musician, composer and pedagogue

=== Subjects ===
- 4-H
- Active learning
- Adult education – Any form of learning adults engage in beyond traditional schooling
- Adventure education – Education style
- Alternative education – Term referring to forms of non-mainstream educational approaches
- Appreciative inquiry – Organizational model
- Apprenticeship
- Business game – Game used for business management education
- Case method – Teaching approach
- Constructivism (philosophy of education) – Theory of knowledge
- Context-based learning
- Contextual learning
- Cooperative education – Type of education
- Design-based learning – Learner centric pedagogy
- Discovery learning – Technique of inquiry-based learning
- Dual education system
- Farmer field school – Process for promoting integrated pest management
- Integrative learning – Learning theory predicated on making connections across curricula
- Junior Achievement – American non-profit youth organization
- Large-group capacitation – Adult education and social psychology concept
- Learning by doing
- Learning by teaching
- Outward Bound – International outdoor education network
- Phenomenon-based learning – Learner centric pedagogy
- Problem-based learning – Learner-centric pedagogy
- Project-based learning – Learner centric pedagogy
- Public sphere pedagogy
- Reflective practice – Ability to reflect on one's actions so as to engage in a process of continuous learning
- Reggio Emilia approach – Educational philosophy and pedagogy
- Ropes course – Outdoor training activity
- Sloyd – System of handicraft-based education
- STEM fields – Umbrella term for technical disciplines
- Sudbury school – Type of democratic education
- Team building – Term for activities used to enhance social relations and define roles within teams
- Training simulation – Virtual medium through which various types of skills can be acquired
- Trial and error
- Vocational education
