= Public sphere pedagogy =

Public sphere pedagogy (PSP) represents an approach to educational engagement that connects classroom activities with real world civic engagement. The focus of PSP programs is to connect class assignments, content, and readings with contemporary public issues. Students are then asked to participate with members of the community in various forms of public sphere discourse and democratic participation, such as town hall meetings and public debate events. Through these events, students are challenged to practice civic engagement and civil discourse.

== Theoretical foundations ==
=== Public sphere theory ===
Public sphere pedagogy is theoretically grounded in Jürgen Habermas' conceptualization of the public sphere. In his seminal work The Structural Transformation of the Public Sphere, Habermas envisioned the public sphere as an inclusive discursive space in which the citizens of a society gathered, discussed, and debated over the issues of the day. Habermas argued that the European bourgeois public sphere that emerged in eighteenth century coffee houses and salons represented an idealized form of the public sphere. Individuals engaging in discussion in these spaces would share and debate their views with one another. Habermas argues that this dialectic encounter was a critical part of one's social life where individuals, as part of a larger public, could construct public opinion through critical rational discourse. Habermas argued that these discussions served to fill the gap between the state and the people by creating what he called a "civil society". Further, Habermas argued that a functioning public sphere was critical to maintaining a healthy democratic order and deliberative democracy.

This traditional notion of a face-to-face public sphere has evolved with the invention of online technologies. The public sphere no longer requires a physical setting, but can manifest in cyberspace. The coffee house discussions idealized by Habermas have expanded to blogs, discussion forums, and online videos. Henry Giroux in particular discusses the role of new media in the public sphere and public pedagogy. However, scholars debate whether computer-mediated communication in an online setting actually constitutes a functioning public sphere or just a public space.

== Applications ==
=== The Town Hall Meeting ===
Town Hall Meetings are one way public sphere pedagogy has been integrated into curriculum. This event began at California State University, Chico in 2007. Classes participating in the Town Hall event require students to research and write about controversial issues. Students then come together with classmates, students from other classes, faculty, and community members. During the Town Hall Meeting, participants move into breakout sessions to share their work and engage in discussions about their topics. Faculty and community members moderate these discussions, share expert insight, and move students toward further development of their work.

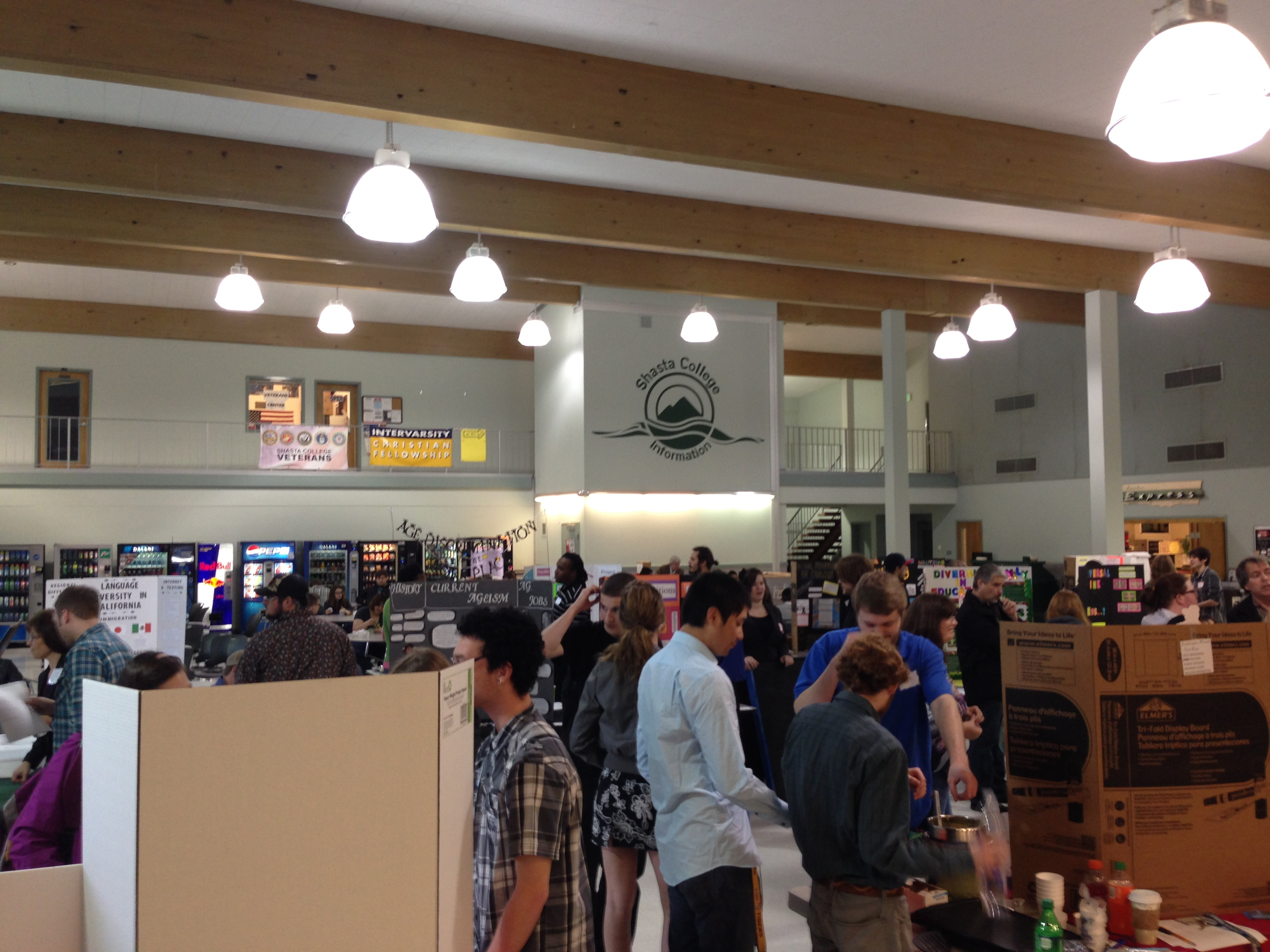
Students participate in interactive poster displays at the Shasta College Great Debate.

=== The Great Debate ===
The Great Debate also uses public sphere pedagogy as its foundation. This event started at California State University, Chico in 2010 and has since been implemented at Butte College, Shasta College, and Chabot College. The Great Debate requires students from a variety of classes to research and write about a controversial theme. These themes have ranged from water and agriculture to mental health. The event is open to the public. Students give individual and group presentations, engage in formal debates, break out into discussion sessions, and display interactive poster presentations. Community members and public officials also participate as moderators, discussion leaders, and debaters. Unlike the Town Hall Meetings, which usually take place on campus property, the Great Debate is hosted in public spaces including City Council Chambers and public libraries.

=== The Student Voices program ===
Student Voices programs are a type of civic engagement initiative that have been implemented in several high schools in the United States. The curriculum has high school students research and complete classroom assignments on current issues in government and candidates in local elections. Students then connect with outside communities via the digital public sphere and engage in moderated "Speak Out" events. Student Voices programs have been successfully implemented in curricula in Seattle and Pennsylvania school districts.

== Critiques ==
Public sphere pedagogy inherently is subject to many of the criticisms of Habermas' conception of the public sphere. Chief among them is the traditionally exclusionary nature. The bourgeois public sphere, as introduced by Habermas, has been characterized as highly patriarchal, and oblivious to the existence of female and plebeian styles of discourse. The concern here is that as a model of the bourgeois public sphere, applications of public sphere pedagogy might alienate students and community members unaccustomed to this type of dialectic experience. In addition to its exclusionary nature, attention has also been called to Habermas' privileging of a hegemonic public sphere. Michael Warner argues that the bourgeois public sphere was structured to be affable to those privileged few who made up the powerful upperclass. While students participating in public sphere pedagogy application receive special training in their classrooms, the same is not necessarily true of community members who participate. This specialized student training draws two critiques. First, conceiving of public pedagogy as a form of instruction risks erasing the plurality that is central to being a public. Training individuals how to be "good" citizens prescribes action in a way that limits the scope of politics and the public sphere. Second, conceiving of public pedagogy as a form of learning risks eclipsing politics with education. Turning political and social issues into learning problems individualizes the issues instead of making them the responsibility of the public.
