= Context-based learning =

Teaching method

Context-based learning (CBL) refers to the use of real-life and fictitious examples in teaching environments in order to learn through the actual, practical experience with a subject rather than just its mere theoretical parts. CBL is a student-centered approach to teaching and learning, utilizing scenarios to replicate the social and political context of the students working/or potential working environment. In the United Kingdom, CBL is often referred to as the Salters' approach due to the efforts of the Salters' Company in creating teaching material in the field of chemistry. It can be generalized as: "The most important single factor influencing learning is the active engagement of the learner with the material. Obtain this – and teach by whatever methods retain this engagement."

== Context-based learning in science education ==
Context-based learning is used in science education by connecting real-world situations and problems to scientific concepts. Rather than teaching scientific ideas and their applications separately, this approach introduces concepts through contexts that students recognize or relate to. For example, lessons may use everyday experiences, environmental issues, or practical problems to introduce scientific topics.

In science classrooms, context-based learning can be used in subjects such as chemistry and physics. Students may explore scientific principles through real problems, research activities, or design challenges. These activities allow students to apply scientific knowledge while developing an understanding of how science relates to everyday life. Context-based science education can also involve changes to the content being taught, classroom activities, and interactions between students and teachers.

Context-based approaches have developed in different countries and used in a variety of scientific curricula. Research on context-based science education has examined approaches such as place-based learning, science kits, and context-based chemistry instruction. These approaches use different materials and learning activities to connect scientific concepts with meaningful situations.

== Role of teachers in context-based learning ==
Teachers play an important role in creating and maintaining context-based learning environments. Implementing this approach may require teachers to change traditional classroom practices, including how lessons are organized, how students interact, and how scientific content is introduced. Instead of presenting information primarily through lectures or memorization, teachers use meaningful contexts to help students explore and apply new concepts.

Teachers must also consider how to assess student understanding in a context-based learning environment. Formative assessments can help teachers identify students’ knowledge gaps and misconceptions while providing opportunities to adjust instruction. A study of a context-based chemistry course involving ninth-grade students found that formative assessment positively affected student achievement and encouraged feedback between students and teachers.

Professional development is another important part of implementing context-based learning. Teachers may need additional training and opportunities to work with other educators to develop effective lessons and classroom practices. Kock and colleagues explain that successfully introducing context-based approaches requires changes to classroom culture, including social norms and patterns of interaction. The editors of Teachers Creating Context-Based Learning Environments in Science also identify teacher professional development as an important, but challenging, part of creating these learning environments.
