= Lego Serious Play =

Facilitation methodology developed at the Lego Group

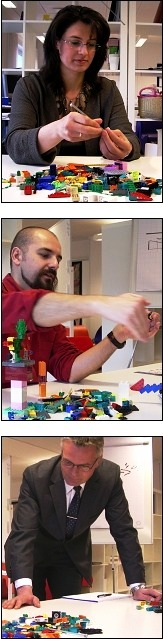
Lego Serious Play in action

Lego Serious Play is a facilitation methodology developed at the Lego Group. Since 2010, it has been available under an open source community-based model. Its goal is to improve creative thinking and communication. Participants build three-dimensional models of their ideas using Lego bricks tell stories about their models. The methodology derives its name from the concept of "serious play".

== Origins ==
Johan Roos and Bart Victor developed the "Serious Play" concept and process in the mid-1990s to enable managers to describe, create and challenge their views on their business. They created Serious Play while they were both professors at IMD in Switzerland.

The conceptual foundation of Serious Play combines ideas from constructivism (Piaget 1951), constructionism (Harel and Papert 1991), complex adaptive system theory (Holland 1995) and autopoietic corporate epistemology (von Krogh and Roos 1994; 1995) applied to the context of management and organizations. It also relies on action research.

The empirical foundation of the concept of Serious Play stems from Roos and Victor's experiments with leadership teams in Tetra Pak, Hydro Aluminium and TFL and during an IMD program for the top 300 leaders in the Lego Group. They presented their early ideas in a 1998 IMD article titled "In Search for Original Strategies: How About Some Serious Play?" and in the 1999 article "Towards a New Model of Strategy-making as Serious Play" published by European Management Journal. In 2004 the journal Long-Range Planning published their article "Playing Seriously with Strategy" (with Matt Statler), which serves as the foundation for Lego Serious Play concept.

== From experiment to open source product ==
The development of the Lego Serious Play product line in the Lego Group involved several teams and more than 20 iterations. Work at the Lego Group began with its owner, Mr. Kjeld Kirk Kristiansen. He was initially hesitant, but after reviewing the early findings, he concluded that Roos and Victor's ideas had business value and decided to support a commercial application under the auspices of the Lego Group.

In 1999, the Lego Group submitted an application to protect the Serious Play trademark. While the Lego Serious Play methodology is currently open source, its trademark is still owned and protected by the Lego Group. The trademark applies to the Lego product line with dedicated Lego Serious Play kits.

In 2001, Executive Discovery, a subsidiary of the Lego Group, submitted the application to patent the methodology and the material product line. Executive Discovery re-submitted the patent application in 2006. However, the U.S. patent office never issued the official patent because by 2008 the application was abandoned by the applicant. The Lego Serious Play methodology was therefore never patent protected.

In 2010, the Lego Group made the methodology open source, releasing the Lego Serious Play methodology under a Creative Commons community-based licence. The main Lego Serious Play communities are: Association of Master Trainers, LSPConnect, Serious Play Pro, and the Global Federation of LSP Master Trainers.

In 2019, Playmobil released Playmobil Pro, a competing product that uses a similar set of plastic figurines and toys for storytelling.

== The research effort ==
In 2000, the Swiss-based think tank Imagination Lab Foundation began researching the Lego Serious Play methodology and the concept of serious play in organizations. The Imagination Lab's research focused on the method's use in organizational strategy development. Their team of researchers wrote three books, 74 working and research papers, and 12 short articles. Imagination Lab ceased to exist in 2004 and created European Academy of Management iLab Foundation Award.

Since 2004, David Gauntlett has published several works on the use of Lego Serious Play in media studies. This approach makes use of metaphor and invites participants to build metaphorical models of their identities. The process of making something, and then reflecting upon it, is claimed to give a more nuanced insight into participants' feelings or experiences.

Since 2007, Louise Møller Haase (née Louise Møller Nielsen) from Aalborg University published her dissertation, subsequent books and articles on personal- and shared experiential concepts and product development and prototyping approaches focusing on Lego Serious Play research projects at TC Electronic, the Red Cross, Daimler AG, and Copenhagen Living Lab.

In 2009, the Lego Serious Play method was further developed for use in schools. Teachers are trained to use the method with students as young as six. The method has also been adapted for use in higher education as a tool for teaching and learning, research, and ideation (Nolan 2009). Subsequently, the International Journal of Management and Applied Research has published a special issue on Lego Serious Play applications.

In 2011, Loizos Heracleous from Warwick Business School and Claus D. Jacobs from the University of St. Gallen completed a two-year research project on embodied metaphors, which elaborated on Lego Serious Play action research at BASF and UNICEF.

The webatelier.net Lab of the Università della Svizzera italiana (University of Lugano, Switzerland) has further developed the methodology, releasing in 2011 URL (User Requirements with LEGO) under the Creative Commons licence.

Since 2014, Alison James from the University of Winchester and her research team have researched the use of Lego Serious Play in various tertiary educational institutions.

== Criticisms ==
Some commentators have criticized of LEGO Serious Play methodology. Journalist Dan Lyons has criticized LEGO Serious Play as "toy therapy" and compared it to New Age psychology. He suggests: "Lego workshops are just one example of the nonsense that is creeping into the workplace. ... The problem isn’t just that these exercises are pointless and silly. For a lot of people, this stuff can be really stressful. For older workers — say, people over 50 — these workshops compound the fear they already have about being pushed out of their jobs. But younger workers hate them too. “It feels like you’ve joined a cult,” says a thirtysomething software programmer whose department spent a day doing a LEGO workshop. “The purpose seems to be to indoctrinate people to follow orders.”"

== Publications ==
- Beltrami G., 2017, LEGO SERIOUS PLAY: pensare con le mani, Franco Angeli
- Blair, S, 2020, 'Mastering the LEGO Serious Play Method: 44 Facilitation Techniques for Trained Lego Serious Play Facilitators.' ProMeet, London (ISBN 978-0-9956647-8-4)
- Blair, S, 2020, 'How to Facilitate the LEGO Serious Play Method Online.’ ProMeet, London (ISBN 978-0-9956647-5-3)
- Blair, S., Rillo M, 2016, 'Serious Work: How to Facilitate Lego Serious Play Meetings and Workshops.' ProMeet, London (ISBN 978-0995664708).
- Bürgi, P., and J. Roos, 2003, 'Images of Strategy,' European Management Journal, 2003, 21(1): 69–78.
- Bürgi, P., and Jacobs, C., and J. Roos, 2005, 'From Metaphor to Practice in the Crafting of Strategy,' Journal of Management Inquiry, 14(1): 78–94.
- Frick, E., S. Tardini, and L. Cantoni, 2014, 'LEGO SERIOUS PLAY applications to enhance creativity in participatory design'. In Fredricka K. Reisman (ed.), Creativity in Business. Research Papers on Knowledge, Innovation and Enterprise, Volume II, KIE Conference Book Series, pp. 200–210. Available at: .
- Frick, E., S. Tardini, and L. Cantoni, 2013, 'White Paper on LEGO SERIOUS PLAY. A state of the art of its application in Europe.' Available at: S-PLAY - S-PLAY White Paper Published!.
- Gauntlett, D. 2005, 'Creative Explorations: New approaches to identities and audiences' London: Routledge.
- Grey. F., and J. Roos, 2005, 'Playing Seriously with Strategy,' Physics World, 18(2): 18–19.
- Harel, I. and Papert, S. 1991, eds. Constructionism, Ablex Publishing Corporation, Piaget, Norwood, NJ.
- Harn, P. L., Hsiao, C.C. (2018). A Preliminary Study on LEGO®-Based Workplace Stress Reduction with Six Bricks and LEGO SERIOUS PLAY® in Taiwan. World Journal of Research and Review, 6 (1),64-67.
- Harn, P. L.( 2017). A Preliminary Study of the Empowerment Effects of Strength-Based LEGO SERIOUS PLAY® on Two Taiwanese Adult Survivors by Earlier Domestic Violence. Psychological Studies, 62(2):142–151.
- Heracleous, L. and Jacobs, C.D., 2012, Crafting Strategy: Embodied Metaphors in Practice. Cambridge University Press (ISBN 978-1107411692)
- Holland, J., 1995, Hidden order: How adaptation builds complexity. Reading, MA: Addison-Wesley.
- James, A. and Brookfield, J. D., 2014, Engaging Imagination: Helping Students Become Creative and Reflective Thinkers. Jossey-Bass.
- James, A. and Nerantzi, C., 2019, The Power of Play in Higher Education. Creativity in Tertiary Learning. Palgrave McMillan.
- Kristiansen, P., and R. Rasmussen, 2014, Building a better business using the LEGO SERIOUS PLAY method. Hoboken, NJ: Wiley.
- Lissack, M., and J. Roos, 1999, The Next Common Sense: Mastering Corporate Complexity through Coherence, Nicholas Brealey Publishing, London (ISBN 1 85788 240-7). Translated into Japanese (2001) and Estonian (2002).
- McCusker, S. (2014) 'Lego, seriously: Thinking through building.' Intl. J. Knowledge, Innovation and Entrepreneurship 2 (1), 27-37
- McCusker, S. Clifford-swan, J.(2018) 'The Use of Metaphors With LEGO SERIOUS PLAY ® For Harmony and Innovation' International Journal of Management and Applied Research 5 (4), 174-192
- McCusker, S. (2019) 'Everybody's monkey is important: LEGO Serious Play® as a methodology for enabling equality of voice within diverse groups' International Journal of Research & Method in Education, 1-17
- Nielsen, L. M., 2010, Personal- and shared experiential concepts. Aalborg University.
- Nolan, S., (2009). 'Physical Metaphorical Modelling with Lego as a Technology for Collaborative Personalised Learning'. In: O'Donoghue, J, (ed). Technology-supported Environments for Personalized Learning: Methods and Case Studies. (Premier Reference Source).
- Oliver, D., and J. Roos, 2007, 'Constructing Organizational Identity,' British Journal of Management, 18(4): 342–358.
- Oliver, D. and J. Roos, 2005, 'Decision Making in High Velocity Environments: The Importance of Guiding Principles,' Organization Studies, 26(6): 889–913.
- Oliver, D., and J. Roos, 2000, Striking a Balance: Complexity and Knowledge Landscapes, McGraw-Hill, Maidenhead (ISBN 0 07709 556-1).
- Piaget, J, 1951, The Child's Conception of the World, Routledge, London.
- Roos, J., 2006, Thinking From Within: A Hands-On Strategy Practice, Palgrave Macmillan, Basingstoke (ISBN 1-4039-8670-3).
- Roos, J., and R. Said, 2005, 'Generating Managerial Commitment and Responsibility,' European Management Review, 2: 48 - 58.
- Roos, J, Victor, B., and M. Statler, 2004, 'Playing Seriously with Strategy,' Long-Range Planning, 37(6): 549–568.
- Roos, J., 2004, 'Sparking Strategic Imagination,' Sloan Management Review, 2004, 46(1): 96.
- Roos, J., and B. Victor, 1999, Towards a Model of Strategy Making as Serious Play,' European Management Journal, 17(4): 348–355.
- Roos, J., and D. Oliver, 1999, 'From Fitness Landscapes to Knowledge Landscapes', Systemic Practice and Action Research, 12(3): 279–293.
- Roos, J., and B. Victor, 'In Search Of Original Strategies: How About Some Serious Play?' IMD Perspectives for Managers, 1998, (26) 15.
- von Krogh, G., and J. Roos, 1995, Organizational Epistemology, Macmillan, Oxford (ISBN 0-312-12498-8).
- Roos, J., 'Transformative Management Education,' 2008, in Teaching and Learning at Business Schools: Transforming the Delivery of Business Education, Bild, M., Mårtensson, P. and K. Nilsson (eds.), Gower: 63–76.
- von Krogh, G., Roos, J., and K. Slocum, 1994, 'An Essay on Corporate Epistemology', Strategic Management Journal, Special Issue on 'Rethinking Strategy - The Search for New Strategy Paradigms', 15: 53–71.
- Statler, M., Roos, J., and B. Victor, 2009, 'Ain't Misbehavin': Taking Play Seriously in Organizations,' Journal of Change Management, 9(1): 87–107.
- Statler, J., Jacobs, J. and J. Roos, 2008, 'Performing Strategy: Analogical Reasoning as Strategic Practice', Scandinavian Journal of Management, 24: 133–144
- Wengel, Y., McIntosh, A. J., & Cockburn-Wootten, C., 2016, Constructing tourism realities through LEGO SERIOUS PLAY®. Annals of Tourism Research, 56, 161–163. Constructing tourism realities through LEGO Serious Play
