= Game analytics =

Behavioral analytics for video games

Game analytics is the form of behavioral analytics that deals with video games. Game analytics involves using quantitative measures, metrics, and tools that can be used to track events that occur over the course of a game, with the goal of capturing such data for statistical analysis. A simple example would be programming a video game to record the number of time each players die in each level and send the data back to the developer, so that developer will know whether some of the levels may be too difficult (i.e., with an excessively high number of player dying) and thus need redesign. The aim of using a game analytics platform is to generate insights to inform developers with regards to player behaviors and business decisions.
