= Friday Night at the ER =

Experiential team-learning game

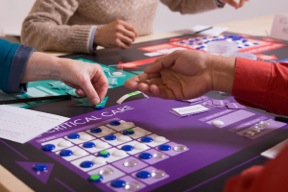
- Friday Night at the ER game board
- Genres: Experiential learning
- Players: 4 per board, 4 to 200 total
- Setup time: 5-10 minutes per board
- Playing time: 75 minutes game play + 90 minutes debriefing
- Age range: For any team that needs to improve performance, ages 16+
- Skills: No healthcare knowledge is needed. A program leader is recommended.
- Website: http://fridaynightattheer.com

Friday Night at the ER is an experiential team-learning game. Played on game boards at tables with four players per board, each gameplay session is followed by a detailed debriefing in which participants relate the simulation experience to their own work and gain insights for performance improvement.

The game simulates the challenge of managing a hospital during a 24-hour period. Players perform distinct functions, but they come to realize that they also depend on one another. While the game was designed to teach systems thinking, it has served diverse learning objectives across many industries and cultures.

Each session includes 1.5 hours of game play followed by approximately 1.5 to 2 hours of debrief and discussion.

== Background ==
The Friday Night at the ER game was developed in 1992 by Breakthrough Learning, Inc., a consulting and training firm based in Morgan Hill, California. Its initial purpose was to broadly teach people to think systemically, collaborating across functional boundaries to achieve system goals. The game's design objectives were:

- to create an experiential learning tool that would engage people in a learning process;
- to simulate and illustrate dynamics that are common to complex systems; and
- to promote an understanding of key systems principles in a way that enables people to gain insight about their relevance.

Since its initial release, Friday Night at the ER has found use for a broader range of learning objectives within diverse organizations. Demonstrating the universality of systems principles, the game is in use by service organizations, manufacturing companies, government agencies, academic institutions and others in at least 30 countries.

== History and development ==
A predecessor learning game, the Beer Distribution Game, demonstrates effective team learning about the behavior of complex systems through an experiential activity.

In 1990, Peter Senge published The Fifth Discipline and popularized systems thinking as a discipline essential to learning organizations.

Friday Night at the ER has its origins in a business case that took place in 1990 at San Jose Medical Center, in San Jose, California, where a persistent problem of decreasing capacity for emergency patients was resolved using a system dynamics study that included a simulation model of patient flow. A high-leverage intervention to resolve the problem required collaboration across departments to share nursing staff during times of peak emergency demand.

In 1992, healthcare management consultant Bette Gardner created Friday Night at the ER, loosely based on that case, to teach management principles and the practice of systems thinking within healthcare and other organizations. The game development process included a computer-based simulation model (using the IThink simulation modelling environment), populated with time-of-day, day-of-week hospital arrival rates, and other data from public and private sources. The game was pilot tested with groups and presented at conferences starting in 1992.

In 1997, Friday Night at the ER was published in electronic form in Activating the Fifth Discipline, a PC-based multimedia education program

Although Friday Night at the ER depicts a hospital based in the United States, it has been adopted and widely used as a team-learning tool both within the healthcare field and beyond, finding use across diverse industries including other service organizations, manufacturing companies, government agencies, and academic institutions. Friday Night at the ER has been used for training in at least 30 countries.

In 2014, an updated version of Friday Night at the ER was released with modernized and upgraded game and support materials.

Reports of the effectiveness of Friday Night at the ER are largely based on Likert surveys, testimonials and Net Promoter surveys. In 2018, educators at the University of North Carolina at Greensboro published results of research in which students were assessed before and after using Friday Night at the ER. They concluded that it is a useful teaching strategy for complex problem solving and application of systems thinking concepts.

== Program structure ==
Participants in a group (from 4 to 200 people) are assembled at tables equipped with game boards and associated materials. A program leader or coordinator provides verbal instructions; then participants play the game on their own for approximately one hour. The gameplay is followed by scoring to measure team performance. After a brief stretch break, participants reconvene for a debriefing. The debrief is facilitated by the program leader with a structured progression of discussion questions, reflection exercises, didactic presentation, and group tasks to bring to light key lessons of the experience, its relevance to the group and how participants will put lessons into practice after the program.

The structure of the program may be varied. For example, the gameplay's 24-hour simulation may be conducted in two 12-hour segments with a short debrief or planning meeting in between segments. Another variation has groups playing in separate rooms with a slightly different instruction or game-board structure in each room so that behavior and results can be compared. In addition to variations in the gameplay, the structure and content of the debrief may be designed to teach either a narrow or broad purpose.

The program generally requires 3.5 to 4 hours to complete the gameplay and debrief.

== Gameplay and scoring ==
At each four-person table, players each manage one of four departments in a hospital: Emergency, Surgery, Critical Care, and Step Down. The gameboard hospital is consolidated and simplified (relative to reality) to enable players to progress through a simulated 24 hours in just one hour.

Each department contains spaces in which patients are treated by staff, and game cards determine new patient arrivals as well as “ready to exit” indicators for patients. The game board may be seen as a hybrid version of a stock-flow map or process-flow chart. Players’ management tasks include determining staffing levels, accepting internal patient transfers, and remaining open to additional patients or diverting new ambulance arrivals. Among the other details of the gameplay are “events” that occur (e.g., a doctor is late, a room is being renovated, a staff member goes home sick), requiring reaction and management by players.

Demand rates in the gameplay, by hour, from mid-day Friday to mid-day Saturday, represent the typical pattern seen in hospitals. Emergency arrivals ramp up during Friday night (a time when people more often engage in risky behaviors that lead to emergencies); while arrivals to other departments in the hospital decrease as the weekend begins. A portion of Emergency arrivals flow through to other departments, so players experience the ripple effect of demand and the challenge of interdepartmental hand-offs.

Consequences of player decisions in the gameplay are both local and systemic. The structure of the game board, role assignments and the accounting system influence players to focus on department performance; yet as the game progresses it becomes evident that the more one tries to optimize a part, the worse the system as a whole performs.

During the gameplay, players keep track of certain data on paperwork forms at each department. Following the gameplay, individuals at each table contribute to calculating a team score that reflects the quality of service they delivered and financial performance. Teams scores are displayed to provide benchmarks and to enable participants to relate behavior to performance.

== Debriefing ==
A standard debrief to teach applied systems thinking is described in the Friday Night at the ER Guide for Program Leaders with presentation slides to support key points. The debrief includes team reflection exercises, guided group discussion, didactic presentation and group tasks.

During the debrief, participants are guided to focus on collaboration, innovation and data-driven decision-making as key strategies necessary for successful system performance. These three strategies are examined and they are shown to be interdependent. Participants see that these three strategies produce excellent performance in the gameplay, and that the same applies to their real-world endeavors within organizations.

While these three strategies are not new ideas to most participants, the question is posed in the debrief, “Why, then, don’t we routinely put these strategies into day-to-day practice?”—as they demonstrated in the gameplay and as seen in the real world? An axiom from the field of system dynamics, “structure drives behavior,” is presented and participants are led through an exercise in which they examine how various structures within their organization may (unintentionally) inhibit desired behaviors.

Numerous variations to the standard debrief have been reported.

== Uses ==
- Improve collaboration across business units.
- Prepare groups for a major change initiative.
- Introduce principles and methods of Systems Thinking, Balanced Scorecards, Lean, theory of constraints, Kaizen, Process Improvement, Six Sigma, Total Quality Management, Agile and other improvement disciplines.
- Clarify success factors and support leadership development in areas such as teamwork, customer satisfaction, conflict management, change management.
- Team building.

Examples of settings include:

- An early meeting of a new, cross-functional project team
- Leadership development, strategic planning or team-building retreat
- A training or education course
- Orientation program for new employees

Examples of outcomes include:

- Guiding principles for working together; improved ability to work together
- New or heightened awareness about:
  - the need to collaborate, to share responsibility for organization performance
  - the presence of mental models and their impact on behavior and decision-making
  - the role of information and feedback in decision-making
- Insight about the underlying structure in organizations that drives behavior and motivation for change
- Personal insight about the effectiveness of one's management and communication practices
- Improved competence in applying a newly learned discipline
