= Serious game =

Game genre

A serious game or applied game is a game designed for a primary purpose other than pure entertainment. The "serious" adjective is generally prepended to refer to video games used by industries like defense, education, scientific exploration, healthcare, emergency management, city planning, engineering, politics, and art. Serious games are a subgenre of serious storytelling, where storytelling is applied "outside the context of entertainment, where the narration progresses as a sequence of patterns impressive in quality ... and is part of a thoughtful progress". The concept shares many characteristics with simulation-based learning and is widely applied in fields such as healthcare, aviation, and professional training, while incorporating game elements to enhance learner engagement and support educational objectives.

== History ==
The formal term "serious game" first appeared in the 1970s and further grew in popularity during the early 2000s. However, the concept of games serving a purpose aside from entertainment can be traced back to the ancient past.

The game Mancala, for example, dates back to 1400 BC and was used as an accounting tool for the trade of animals and food.

Other games intended to provide lessons along with entertainment. The ancient board game snakes and ladders traditionally features didactic content, with the player's movement up or down the board representing the respective consequences of good and bad deeds.

The use of games in educational circles has been practiced since at least the twentieth century. For example, Lizzie Magie created a game called The Landlord's Game, a predecessor of Monopoly, in 1903. Use of paper-based educational games became popular in the 1960s and 1970s, but waned under the Back to Basics teaching movement. (The Back to Basics teaching movement is a change in teaching style that started in the 1970s after student scores declined on standardized tests and students were alleged to be exploring too many electives. This movement wanted to focus students on reading, writing and arithmetic and intensify the curriculum.) Clark C. Abt is credited for coining the term "serious games" in the 1970s, defined as games that have an "explicit and carefully thought-out educational purpose and are not intended to be played primarily for amusement." Abt also recognized that this "does not mean that serious games are not, or should not be, entertaining."

The early 2000s saw a surge in different types of educational games, especially those designed for the younger learner. Many of these games were not computer-based but took on the model of other traditional gaming systems both in the console and hand-held formats. In 1999, LeapFrog Enterprises introduced the LeapPad, which combined an interactive book with a cartridge and allowed kids to play games and interact with a paper-based book. Based on the popularity of traditional hand-held gaming systems like Nintendo's Game Boy, they also introduced their hand-held gaming system called the Leapster in 2003. This system was cartridge-based and integrated arcade–style games with educational content.

Also in the 2000s, educational games saw an expanse into sustainable development with titles such as Learning Sustainable Development in 2000 and Climate Challenge in 2006.

Other directions for serious video games beyond education began to emerge in the early 2000s, with America's Army in 2002 as an early example. The game was a first-person shooter developed by the United States Army as a recruitment tool, and later used as an early training tool for new recruits.

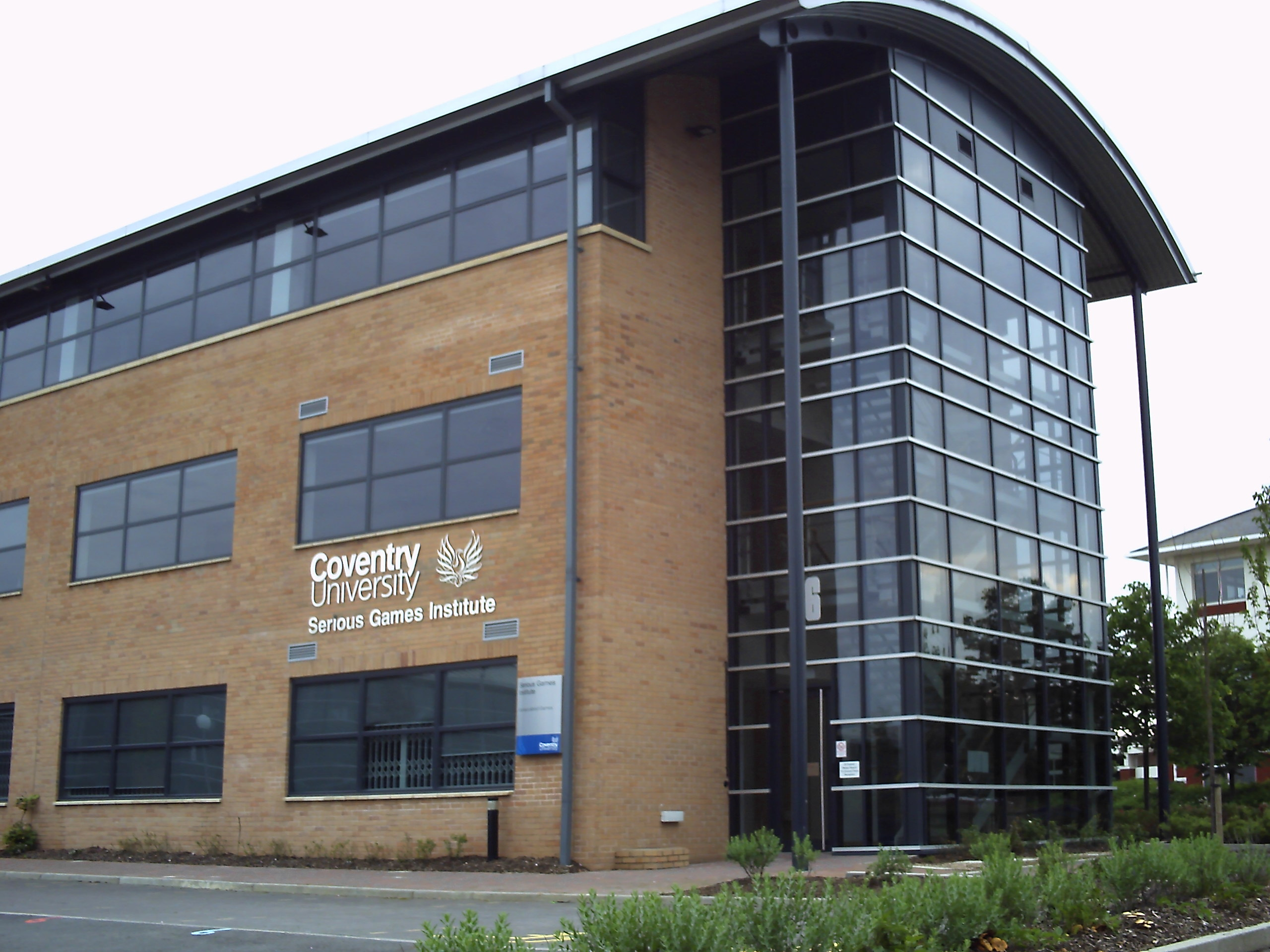
Coventry University Serious Games Institute

By 2010, serious games had evolved to incorporate actual economies like Second Life, in which users can create actual businesses that provide virtual commodities and services for Linden dollars, which are exchangeable for US currency. In 2015, Project Discovery was launched as a serious game. Project Discovery was launched as a vehicle by which geneticists and astronomers with the University of Geneva could access the cataloging efforts of the gaming public via a mini-game contained within the Eve Online massively multiplayer online role-playing game (MMORPG). Players acting as citizen scientists categorize and assess actual genetic samples or astronomical data. This data was then utilized and warehoused by researchers. Any data flagged as atypical was further investigated by scientists.

== Applications ==
=== Adult education ===
Real simulations and simulation games provide the user with the opportunity to gain experience. Actions generated from knowledge can be tested here according to the trial and error principle. Theoretical knowledge can either be acquired beforehand or imparted during the game, which can then be tested in a virtual practice. There is an educational policy interest in the professionalisation of such offers. With the research project NetEnquiry, the Federal Ministry of Education and Research supports a corresponding research project for education and training, implemented here with the focus on mobile learning. In addition, there is an increasing incorporation of serious games within university curricula which students can use to consolidate learning or enhance knowledge.

=== Agriculture and environmental management ===
Serious games have been increasingly applied in agriculture and environmental management since the late 1960s, addressing topics such as natural resource management, climate adaptation, pesticide reduction, and territorial governance. A 2025 systematic review based on the PRISMA method, conducted by researchers from the GAMAE platform (INRAE, France) and the WUR Games Hub ([[Wageningen University & Research]], Netherlands), identified 237 published studies on serious games in agriculture, documenting a rapid growth since 2010 across crop management, livestock farming, irrigation, and land-use planning. The review found that these games primarily serve three purposes: learning (especially on specific agricultural topics), mediation and co-design of practices among stakeholders, and scientific research.

Several participatory approaches have been influential in this domain. The companion modelling (ComMod) approach, developed by researchers at CIRAD and INRAE, uses role-playing games combined with agent-based models to support collective decision-making in socio-ecological systems. At Wageningen University & Research, gaming approaches have been developed for smallholder agriculture and the design of sustainable agricultural landscapes.

Games in this field range from board and card games used in agricultural extension services to hybrid games combining physical and digital components. Role-playing games have been used to facilitate dialogue on livestock farming transitions, while online simulation games have been designed to teach agroecology. The growing body of research has also raised questions about the assessment of real-world impact of these games, identified as a key gap in the field.

=== Art games ===
An art game uses the medium of computer games to create interactive and multimedia art. For the first time, the term was described scientifically in 2002 to emphasize games that attach more importance to art than to game mechanics. Mostly they convince by a special aesthetics and atmosphere and use the interactivity for creativity and the thought stimulation of the player. Art created by or through computer games are also called art games.

=== Exercise therapy ===
These include serious games that animate the player to sport and movement. For example, hand-eye coordination and upper body muscles can be trained using Wii Sports, regardless of age and physical disabilities, alone or with others. Even simple Jump-'n'-Run games can have an educational purpose, depending on the user. They are partly used in rehabilitation therapies to restore the user's finger mobility, reaction speed and eye-finger coordination.

=== Health care ===
On the one hand, the health sector includes digital games for professional medical training, such as surgical simulations to train doctors or to impart specialist knowledge. On the other hand, they address the private end user who uses them, for example, as motivation tools for a healthier lifestyle, nutrition or for rehabilitation purposes. In addition, serious games can be used as a training measure for patients to improve their understanding of their own medical conditions and navigate possible therapy options. There is also an increasing use of serious games in health education programs.

In the field of elderly care, dementia treatment and neurorehabilitation, serious games are used to address cognitive decline and social isolation. The Tovertafel was the first device to use serious gaming through light-projected games to stimulate cognitive and physical activity among individuals with cognitive impairments. Peer-reviewed studies have indicated that such interactive interventions and serious games can help reduce apathy and improve the quality of life for residents in care facilities.

On 15 June 2020, the Food and Drug Administration approved the game EndeavorRx, the first video game that serves as a treatment for children aged 8-12 with primarily inattentive or combined-type ADHD. The game, intended for use in tandem with other treatments, is indicated to improve attention function and can be downloaded with a prescription onto a mobile device. Patients play it for 30 minutes a day, 5 days a week, over a month-long treatment plan.

=== Intelligence ===
Board games have been used to train employees of intelligence agencies. For example, the Sherman Kent School for Intelligence Analysis, an arm of the Central Intelligence Agency, uses Kingpin: The Hunt for El Chapo, a two-player game where one player represents drug trafficker Joaquín Guzmán and his cartel while the other one plays as law enforcement agencies who aim to capture Guzmán. During a lesson, students play the game twice: once as law enforcement, once as the cartel, and the instructor periodically gives each player useful information. Due to time constraints, the games the CIA uses are not always designed to be played in their entirety. Instead, the goal is to teach the prospective analysts how to figure out which information is useful and when to act on it.

=== Military games ===
Games like America's Army are training simulations that are used in the training and recruitment of soldiers. The games try to represent warfare as realistically as possible in order to familiarize users with the dangers, strategies, weapons, tactics and vehicles.

=== Politics, culture and advertising ===
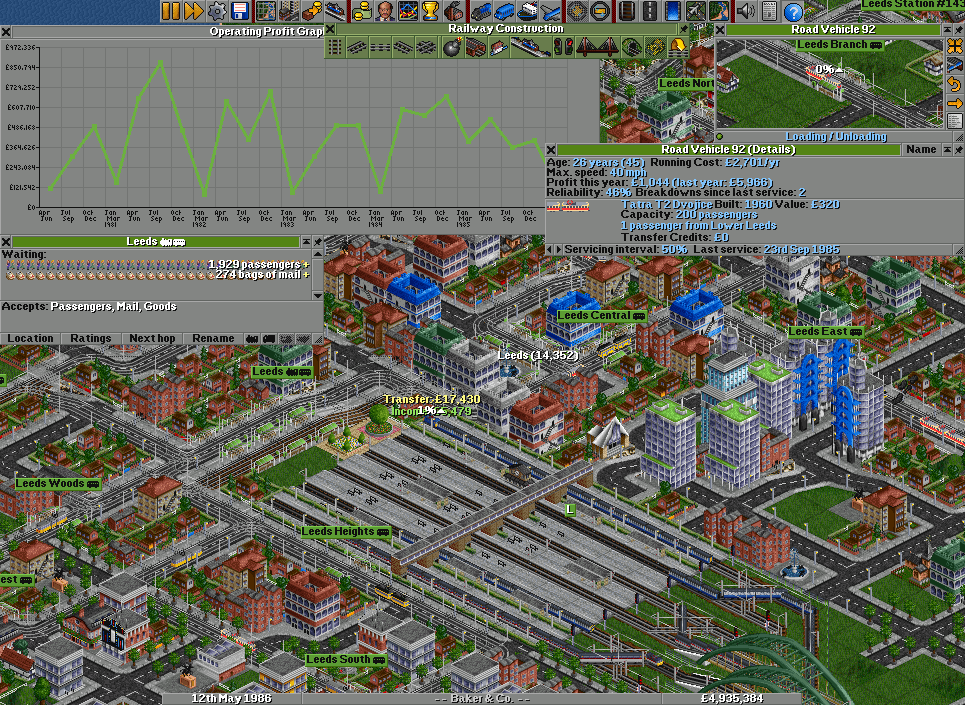
OpenTTD, a game that simulates running a railroad business

Persuasive games are developed for advertisers, policy makers, news organizations and cultural institutions. They are politically and socially motivated games that serve social communication. They cover areas such as politics, religion, environment, urban planning and tourism. The aim is to lead to create a demand for product due to a generated positive exposure to the product in the game or introduce new ways of thinking through experience.

=== Product creation games ===
The aim here is to give the user an understanding of a company's products. The user can test the products in a simulation under real conditions and convince themselves of their functionality. Technical basics, handling and security risks can be taught to the user.

=== Recruitment games ===
This type of serious games is intended to bring the user closer to tasks that would otherwise be less in the limelight. Companies try to present and profile themselves through such games in order to attract apprentices and applicants. Future tasks will be presented and carried out in a large context, for example "TechForce", in which various technical areas are combined into an end product with the aim of winning a race.

=== Scientific tool ===
In 2021, Heather R. Campbell, a graduate student at the University of Kentucky, published her doctoral dissertation, Towards a Holistic Risk Model For Safeguarding the Pharmaceutical Supply Chain: Capturing the Human-Induced Risk to Drug Quality. In this work, Campbell developed a virtual pharmaceutical manufacturing plant and used the flexibility of video games to develop various real-life scenarios. The scenarios were then played by humans under different motivating objectives through a series of experiments. The results allowed Campbell to gather useful information on what might be the next threat to the pharmaceutical supply chain. The results showed promise for the future of video games as a scientific data collection tool and was featured in a Bloomberg Prognosis article.

=== Security ===
Serious games in the security sector are mainly aimed for disaster control, defense and recruitment. Serious games can support a wide range of public, private and municipal institutions, including fire departments, law enforcement, federal agencies (such as tPublic, private and municipal institutions, such as fire brigades, police, federal agencies (including the Federal Agency for Technical Relief in Germany) and NGOs and other humanitarian organizations like the Red Cross. By simulating scenarios such as natural disasters, acts of terrorism, and emergency medical crises, these games allow personnel to practice danger prevention and response in a controlled environment. One of the advantages of these simulations is the ability to test decision-making under time pressure and high-stakes conditions while minimizing the costs and logistical resources required for real drills.

An example of a serious game in this sector is the Emergency game series and the various disaster management simulators that allow teams to explore the response of communities to disaster situations.

=== Youth education ===
The user is given tasks and missions that they can only solve with the knowledge that they will gradually discover during the game. The theoretical aspects of the game are always taught in small quantities at the right time to be able to solve the next task and thus test the theoretical approaches in practice.

== Evaluation and impact assessment ==
The evaluation of serious game effects remains a methodological challenge. While many games are designed with specific intended outcomes, measuring whether those outcomes are achieved requires rigorous assessment methods. Evaluation approaches range from satisfaction surveys (measuring participants' immediate reactions) to longer-term impact studies assessing behavioural or systemic change.

Several frameworks have been proposed to structure evaluation. Adaptations of Kirkpatrick's four levels of training evaluation have been used to assess games along dimensions of reaction, learning, behaviour, and results. Other scholars have drawn on realist evaluation, contribution analysis, and theory of change approaches to account for the complex, context-dependent nature of game-based interventions.

== See also ==
- Agricultural extension
- Brain fitness
- Business game
- Business simulation game
- Educational video game
- Edutainment
- Games and learning
- Game with a purpose
- Games for Change
- Gamification
- Gamification of learning
- Global warming game
- Innovation game
- Intelligent tutoring system
- International Simulation and Gaming Association
- Learning objects
- Lego Serious Play
- List of educational video games
- Participatory modeling
- Reacting games
- Serious Games Showcase and Challenge
- Serious play
- Technology and mental health issues
- Transreality gaming
