= Simulations and games in economics education =

A simulation game is "a game that contains a mixture of skill, chance, and strategy to simulate an aspect of reality, such as a stock exchange". Similarly, Finnish author Virpi Ruohomäki states that "a simulation game combines the features of a game (competition, cooperation, rules, participants, roles) with those of a simulation (incorporation of critical features of reality). A game is a simulation game if its rules refer to an empirical model of reality". A properly built simulation game used to teach or learn economics would closely follow the assumptions and rules of the theoretical models within this discipline.

== In economics education ==
Economics education studies recommend the adoption of more active and collaborative learning methodologies (Greenlaw, 1999). Simkins (1999) stated "… teaching practices, which rely heavily on the lecture format, are not doing enough to develop students' cognitive learning skills, attract good students to economics, and motivate them to continue coursework in the discipline" (p. 278). This is consistent with the results of a survey published in the American Economic Review by Allgood (2004) that shows that students "rarely take economics as a free elective – especially beyond principles" (p.5). More is needed to be done in the classroom to excite students about economics education.

Simulations supplement the standard lecture. Both computerized and non-computer based simulation and games show significant levels of growth in education (see Lean, Moizer, Towler, and Abbey, 2006; Dobbins, Boehlje, Erickson and Taylor, 1995; Gentry, 1990;).

== Example in monopolistic competition ==
Through a simulation game, students may participate directly in a market by managing a simulated firm and making decisions on price and production to maximize profits. An excellent review of the use of a successful market simulation is given by Motahar (1994) in the Journal of Economics Education.

A monopolistic competition simulation game can be used as an example in the standard economics classroom or for experimental economics. Economic experiments using monopolistic competition simulations can create real-world incentives that may be used in the teaching and learning of economics to help students better understand why markets and other exchange systems work the way they do. An explanation of experimental economics is given by Roth (1995).

Assumptions of monopolistic competition

A simulation game in monopolistic competition needs to incorporate the standard theoretical assumptions of this market structure, including:

- Many buyers and sellers
- Easy entry and exit
- Some degree of product differentiation
- Zero economic profits in the long-run

In a simulation of monopolistic competition, each firm must be small in size, and should not be able to influence the direction of the overall market. Yet each firm has some control over price owing to product differentiation. To be consistent with economic theory, the simulation model should allow entry of new firms to occur as long as profits are greater than normal, and economic profits exist. The entry of new firms will decrease the market price, and eventually cause economic profits to return to zero (see Baye, 2009).

Controllable decisions in monopolistic competition

To simulate monopolistic competition, the controllable firm decisions of the participants (students) must include, at a minimum, those specified in the standard theoretical model, including (see Baye, 2009):

- Firm price
- Advertising
- Firm production
- Plant Size

Simulation game experience

From an educational point of view, students will have an "opportunity" to learn by their own observations and experience through participation in a simulation game (see Schmidt, 2003). Consistent with the theoretical model of monopolistic competition (see Baye, 2009), student participants would observe and experience that their pricing decisions are controlled by the market. They would "experience" that in the simulation they would have to lower their firm's price to be competitive as new firms entered the market. In the long-run, they would see the impact of changing plant size. They would observe that the successful firms would take advantage of economies of scale, but would also be careful not to incur diseconomies of scale in the long-run. Students would experience that economic profits cannot be maintained in the long-run. They would see, first hand, that their accounting profits will inevitably decline and move closer to normal profits. This experience provides students an opportunity to learn (as a supplement to the lecture and readings) the economic messages of monopolistic competition.

== Examples in Macroeconomics ==
A simple baseline economy model has been proposed by M. Lengnick (2013). This model consists of two types of economic actors only: households playing the roles of workers/employees and consumers, and firms playing the roles of employers and producers/suppliers. All firms produce and sell the same abstract consumption good that is bought (and consumed) by households. The model has originally been implemented in Java, but is also available as a web-based simulation.

In 2018, Harvard Business Publishing published "Macroeconomics Simulation: Econland". This 30-minute simulation brings economic policy-making to life by allowing students to make monetary and fiscal policy decisions and consider their impact on the economy of a fictional country. Students manage the economy through a 7-year business cycle in an effort to maximize the approval rating from their population. Exploring the trade-offs of economic policy decision-making and the effects of the global economic environment on a country, students consolidate their understanding of core macroeconomic concepts, including GDP, unemployment, inflation, and budget deficit. At a deeper level, students develop critical thinking skills and learn about economic modeling and system dynamics. The simulation won a Silver Medal at the International Serious Play Awards.

== See also ==
- Category:Economic simulation board games
- Business game
- Business simulation
- Business simulation game
- Game (simulation)
- Government simulation game
- Miniconomy
- Training simulation

== Additional References ==
- Allgood, S., Bosshardt, W., Van der Klaauw, W., and Watts, M. (2004). What Students Remember and Say about College Economics Years Later. American Economic Review, 94(2), 259-65.
- Dobbins, C. L., Boehlje, M., Erickson, S., and Taylor, R. (1995). Using Games to Teach Farm and Agribusiness Management, Review of Agricultural Economics, 17(3), 247-255.
- Fritzche, D., and Cotter, R. (1990). Guidelines for Administering Business Games, in Guide to Business Gaming and Experiential Learning, edited by Gentry, J., ABSEL, Nichols/GP Publishing, East Brunswick, 74-89.
- Gentry, J., ed., (1990), Guide to Business Gaming and Experiential Learning, ABSEL, Nichols/GP Publishing, East Brunswick.
- Greenlaw, S.A. (1999). Using groupware to enhance teaching and learning in undergraduate economics, Journal of Economic Education, 30(winter), 33-42.
- Lean, J., Moizer, M., Towler, C. A. (2006). Active Learning in Higher Education, Journal of Simulation and games, 7(3), 227-242.
- McHaney, R., White, D., Heilman, G. E. (2002). Simulation Project Success and Failure: Survey Findings, Simulation & Gaming, 33(1), 49-66.
- Mills, B.J. and Cottell, P.G. (1998), Cooperative learning for higher education faculty, Phoenix, Ariz.: Oryx Press
- Simkins, S.P. (1999), Promoting active-student learning using the World Wide Web in economics courses, Journal of Economic Education, 30(Summer), 278-91.
