= Business game =

Game used for business management education

Business game (also called business simulation game) refers to simulation games that are used as an educational tool for teaching business. Business games may be carried out for various business training such as: general management, finance, organizational behavior, human resources, etc. Often, the term "business simulation" is used with the same meaning.

A business game is defined as "a game with a business environment that can lead to one or both of the following results: the training of players in business skills (hard and/or soft), or the evaluation of players' performances (quantitatively and/or qualitatively)".

Business games are used as a teaching method in universities, and more particularly in business schools, but also for executive education.

Simulation are considered to be an innovative learning method, and are often computer-based.

== History ==
Computer-supported business simulation originated from military war games, and came into existence during the late 1950s. Business simulation games, including non-computer-based board games and experiential activities, have since been used as a learning tool for teaching management (Jackson 1959) (Andlinger 1958). It is regularly in use at universities, and in particularly by major business schools. As an example, the University of Washington has been using business simulation game in classes since 1957 (Saunders 1996, p. 49).

The INTOP tool was developed at the University of Chicago in 1963, and was employed for teaching in 160 institutions worldwide from 1963 until 2005. Its successor INTOPIA was first released in 1995, and it has been used by universities in over 55 countries around the world, including 18 in the U.S.

Business games are also used within companies for management training and development (Faria 1990).

== Target Groups ==
- Managers and junior managers in business, authorities and administration for training the leadership skills.
- Employees from technical / natural sciences who need business knowledge for their work.
- Students of business administration and industrial engineering to apply what they have learned.
- Trainees to understand business processes and essential relationships.
- Pupils to clarify what a company is and how it works.

== See also ==
- Beer distribution game
- Friday Night at the ER
- Military simulation
- Project management simulation
- Roleplay simulation
- Serious game
- Simulations and games in economics education
- Training simulation
