= Simul8 =

Simulation software

SIMUL8
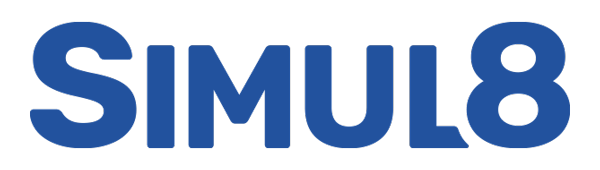
- Original author(s): SIMUL8 Corporation
- Developer(s): SIMUL8 Corporation
- Stable release: SIMUL8 2024
- Operating system: Cloud edition: any OS with a modern browser, Desktop edition: Windows 11, 10, 8, 7, XP, Vista, 2000, 98, 95, NT4, Windows server 2019, 2016, 2008, 32 bit and 64 bit
- Available in: English, Japanese
- Type: Simulation & Optimization
- License: Proprietary, Concurrent User Licensing
- Website: https://www.simul8.com

SIMUL8 simulation software is a product of the SIMUL8 Corporation used for simulating systems that involve processing of discrete entities at discrete times. SIMUL8 allows its user to create a computer model, which takes into account real life constraints, capacities, failure rates, shift patterns, and other factors affecting the total performance and efficiency of production.

SIMUL8 can be used to model any process where there is a flow of work, however the main areas of use are in manufacturing, health care, contact centers, automotives and supply chain.

== Model building ==
Construction of SIMUL8 models is usually not based on programming or statistical data, but rather on drawing organization schemes on the screen. However, SIMUL8 implements a two-way interface with Visual Basic, which leaves space for creation of model features which cannot be modeled using only the graphical interface. SIMUL8 also provides its own simulation language called Visual Logic, which allows the user to implement logic of the simulation.

== Basic components of SIMUL8 environment ==
A SIMUL8 simulation revolves around processing work items. They enter the system via work entry points, pass through work centers, may temporarily reside in storage areas and leave via work exit points. In addition to this mechanism, work centers may need specific resources to process work items. A simulation consists of a number of these objects and of the routes between them, modeled as a directed graph.

Component	Description
Work item (element, entity)	models physical or logical objects moving through the system. Entities enter the system, induce different sorts of activities, use different kinds of resources and at the end leave the system. A customer, product or document can be a SIMUL8 model entity.
Entrance (Work entry point)	objects that represent the entry of entities into the system (for example an arrival of customer or formation of a product
Activity (Work center, action)	objects that model activities which the entities go through. Resources are typically used during execution of an activity
Queue (Storage bin, stack)	objects that model cumulation of entities. The stack usually precedes activities for which the stacked entities wait because of lack of resources
Exit (Work exit point)	a place through which the entities leave the modeled system (completion of an order, leaving of a customer)
Resource (source)	objects that are used for modeling capacity restraints of workers, material or means of production used in activities
Route	objects that connect all the other simulation objects. They represent sequences of activities and thus the movement of entities in the system.

== See also ==
- Discrete event simulation
- Computer model
- Process optimization
- Simulation software
- List of discrete event simulation software
