= List of discrete event simulation software =

This is a list of notable discrete-event simulation software.

== Commercial ==
Software	Publisher	Description	Last updated
AnyLogic	The AnyLogic Company	A general purpose multimethod modeling tool. Combines agent-based, system dynamics, and discrete event modeling.	November 20, 2024
Arena (software)	Rockwell Automation	A discrete event simulation program that also allows modeling of continuous processes.	August 28, 2019
Care pathway simulator	SAASoft Ltd.	A discrete event simulation program specifically designed for service industries e.g. healthcare.	Unknown
Enterprise Dynamics	INCONTROL Simulation Solutions	A simulation software platform to model and analyze virtually any manufacturing, material handling and logistics challenge.	July 18, 2018
ExtendSim	Imagine That Inc.	A general purpose, multi-method simulation and analysis tool that also includes discrete rate and reliability block diagramming components.	March 7, 2023
DELMIA	Dassault Systemes	Part of the 3DEXPERIENCE platform of Dassault Systemes	June 7, 2019
FlexSim	FlexSim Software Products, Inc.	A discrete event simulation software with a drag-and-drop interface for modeling simulations in 3D.	March 14, 2025
GoldSim	GoldSim Technology Group LLC	Combines system dynamics with aspects of discrete event simulation, embedded in a Monte Carlo framework.	September 21, 2015
GPSS	Various	A discrete event simulation language. Different implementations are available through vendors.	Various
Micro Saint Sharp	Alion Science	A general purpose discrete event modeling tool that uses a drag and drop interface and the C# programming language.	May 20, 2019
MS4 Modeling Environment	RTSync Corporation	A general purpose DEVS methodology based software environment for discrete event and hybrid models.	July 23, 2015
Plant Simulation	Siemens PLM Software	Software that enables the simulation and optimization of production systems and processes.	May 3, 2019
Simcad Pro	CreateASoft, Inc	Discrete event simulation software. On-The-Fly model changes while the simulation is running. Visual interface with no coding environment. Includes VR and Physics engine.	August 11, 2016
SimEvents	MathWorks	Adds discrete event simulation to the MATLAB/Simulink environment.	September 14, 2016
SIMUL8	SIMUL8 Corporation	Object-based simulation software	January 22, 2019
Visual Components	Visual Components Oy	The next generation of 3D manufacturing simulation technology. Designed for manufacturing professionals and built on a powerful, flexible, and scalable platform.	September 21, 2023
VisualSim	Mirabilis Design Inc.	Model-based system architecture exploration of electronics, embedded software and semiconductors based on timing, power consumption and functionality	June 11, 2017

== Open source ==
Name	Language	Type	Last updated	License	Description
CPN Tools	BETA	Application	February 1, 2015 (v4.0.1)	GPLv2	A tool to analyse logistics/queuing models in all types of applications.
DESMO-J	Java	Library	November 30, 2015 (v2.5.1c)	Apache 2.0	A framework for discrete-event simulation in Java, supporting hybrid event/process models and providing animation in 2D and 3D.
gem5	C++	Application	December 31, 2025 (v25.1.0.0)	BSD	The gem5 simulator is a modular platform for computer-system architecture research, encompassing system-level architecture as well as processor microarchitecture.
JaamSim	Java	Application	February 24, 2026 (v.2026-01)	Apache 2.0	JaamSim is a fast and scalable discrete-event simulation software that includes a drag-and-drop user interface, interactive 3D graphics, input and output processing and model development tools and editors. "Out of all the OS DES projects we reviewed, JaamSim is the one with the most impressive 3D user interface that can compete against COTS DES software. (...) The fact that a non-expert user can just download and test the software in a few minutes is something that is a scarce attribute in OS projects and especially in the DES domain. (...) It is the only tool we found that is clearly industry driven (...) and this may have led to more consistent motivation and funding." "JaamSim provides everything which is necessary to model typical planning tasks in production and logistics and proves as a real alternative to commercial DES tools."
Ptolemy II	Java	Library	December 17, 2014 (v10.0.1)	BSD	A software framework supporting experimentation with actor-oriented design.
SIM.JS	JavaScript	Library	January 16, 2012 (v0.26)	LGPL	SIM.JS is a general-purpose Discrete Event Simulation library written entirely in JavaScript. Runs in browser and a GUI-based modeling tool is supported.
SimPy	Python	Library	November 12, 2023 (4.1.1)	MIT	SimPy is a process-based discrete-event simulation framework based on standard Python.
Simula	Simula	Language	June 1, 1967		A programming language designed specifically for simulation.
SystemC	C++	Library	November 15, 2018 (v2.3.3)	Apache 2.0	A set of C++ classes and macros which provide an event-driven simulation kernel.

== See also ==
- List of computer-aided engineering software
