= Visual Components =

- Developer: Visual Components Oy
- Initial release: 2000; 26 years ago
- Stable release: Visual Components 5.0 / March 12, 2026; 2 months ago
- Operating system: Microsoft Windows
- Available in: English, German, Korean, Japanese, Simplified Mandarin (Chinese)
- Type: Simulation software
- License: Proprietary
- Website: visualcomponents.com

Visual Components is a developer of 3D simulation software for manufacturing. Visual Components software is used for applications including layout planning, production simulation, off-line programming and PLC verification.

== History ==
Visual Components was founded in 1999, in Helsinki, Finland. The company's first product was a layout configuration and visualization tool for JOT Automation, a Finnish automation solution supplier. In December 2017, Visual Components was acquired by German automation conglomerate KUKA AG. Following the acquisition, KUKA announced that Visual Components would continue to support and expand its list of robot models. It currently supports over 1,200 models from more than 30 brands. Visual Components and KUKA have since released additional software in the fields of robot simulation, programming and 3D design.

In November 2022, it was announced Visual Components had acquired the robotics division of Delfoi, an international provider of robot offline programming (OLP) software solutions. This acquisition led to the development of the Robotics OLP products, which were released in September 2023.

== Release history ==
| Year | Product name |
|---|---|
| 2000 | 3DVideo |
| 2000 | 3DRealize |
| 2003 | 3DRealize R |
| 2004 | 3DCreate |
| 2010 | 3DSimulate |
| 2012 | 3DAutomate |
| 2016 | Visual Components 4.0: Essentials; Professional; Premium |
| 2023 | Visual Components Robotics OLP: Robotics OLP; Professional OLP; Premium OLP |

== See also ==
- Simulation software
- Visualization software
- Discrete event simulation
- List of discrete event simulation software
- List of robotics software
- Robotics Simulation Software
- Off-line Programming (robotics)
- Programmable Logic Controller
- Industry 4.0
- Automation
