= SIM.JS =

SIM.JS, a free discrete-event simulation package based on JavaScript
- Original author: Maneesh Varshney
- Developer: Maneesh Varshney
- Stable release: 0.26 / January 16, 2012; 14 years ago
- Written in: JavaScript
- Operating system: Cross-platform
- Type: Discrete event simulation
- License: LGPL
- Website: simjs.z5.web.core.windows.net code.google.com/p/simjs-source/

SIM.JS is an event-based discrete-event simulation library based on standard JavaScript. The library has been written in order to enable simulation within standard browsers by utilizing web technology.

SIM.JS supports entities, resources (Facility, Buffers and Stores), communication (via Timers, Events and Messages) and statistics (with Data Series, Time Series and Population statistics).

The SIM.JS distribution contains tutorials, in-depth documentation, and a large number of examples.

SIM.JS is released as open source software under the LGPL license. The first version was released in January 2011.

== Example ==
There are several examples bundled with the library download. Trafficlight simulation is a standard simulation problem, which may be simulated as within this example:

function trafficLightSimulation(GREEN_TIME, MEAN_ARRIVAL, SEED, SIMTIME) {
    var sim = new Sim();
    var random = new Random(SEED);
    var trafficLights = [new Sim.Event("North-South Light"),
                         new Sim.Event("East-West Light")]; 
    var stats = new Sim.Population("Waiting at Intersection");
    
    var LightController = {
        currentLight: 0,  // the light that is turned on currently
        start: function () {
            sim.log(trafficLights[this.currentLight].name + " OFF"
                    + ", " + trafficLights[1 - this.currentLight].name + " ON");
            sim.log("------------------------------------------");
            // turn off the current light
            trafficLights[this.currentLight].clear();
            // turn on the other light.
            // Note the true parameter: the event must "sustain"
            trafficLights[1 - this.currentLight].fire(true);
            // update the currentLight variable
            this.currentLight = 1 - this.currentLight;
            // Repeat every GREEN_TIME interval
            this.setTimer(GREEN_TIME).done(this.start);
        }
    };
