= MS4 Modeling Environment =

Software

- Launch page of MS4 Me
- Developer(s): MS4 Systems, Inc.
- Written in: Java
- Operating system: Cross-platform
- Type: Simulation software Discrete Event Simulation System Software
- License: Proprietary
- Website: www.ms4systems.com

MS4 Modeling Environment (MS4 Me) is a discrete event simulation system (DEVS) software developed by MS4 Systems, Inc. It has been used in the modeling of complex systems (such as a national health care system) and is also covered in a discrete event simulation and systems of systems modeling text.

MS4 Me supports the development and simulation of DEVS models via a natural language or Java. Finite Deterministic DEVS (FDDEVS) models can also be quickly developed and analyzed. DEVS models can be composed into more complex systems via the use of System Entity Structures, and System Entity Structures can be composed into complex systems of systems for simulation. Many different configurations of these systems can be stored and simulated via the use of pruning.

== See also ==
- Computer simulation
- List of discrete event simulation software
