= AnyLogic =

Multimethod simulation modeling tool

- Developer: The AnyLogic Company (formerly XJ Technologies)
- Release: 2000
- Stable release: 8.9.9 Professional / June 2026
- Written in: Java SE
- Operating system: Windows, macOS, Linux
- Available in: English, Chinese, Spanish, Russian, Portuguese (Brazil)
- Type: Simulation software
- License: Proprietary;
- Website: www.anylogic.com

AnyLogic is a multimethod simulation modeling tool developed by The AnyLogic Company (formerly XJ Technologies). It supports agent-based, discrete event, and system dynamics simulation methodologies. AnyLogic is cross-platform simulation software that works on Windows, macOS and Linux. AnyLogic is used to simulate: markets and competition, healthcare, manufacturing, supply chains and logistics, retail, business processes, social and ecosystem dynamics, defense, project and asset management, pedestrian dynamics and road traffic, IT, and aerospace. It is considered to be among the major players in the simulation industry, especially within the domain of business processes is acknowledged to be a powerful tool.

== History ==
In the early 1990s, there was a significant interest in the mathematical approach to modeling and simulation of parallel processes. This approach was applied to the analysis of the correctness of parallel and distributed programs. The Distributed Computer Network (DCN) research group at Saint Petersburg Polytechnic University developed a software system for the analysis of program correctness; the new tool was named COVERS (Concurrent Verification and Simulation). This system allowed graphical modeling notation to be used for describing structure and behavior of system. The tool was developed with the help of a research grant from Hewlett-Packard (Commonly known as HP).

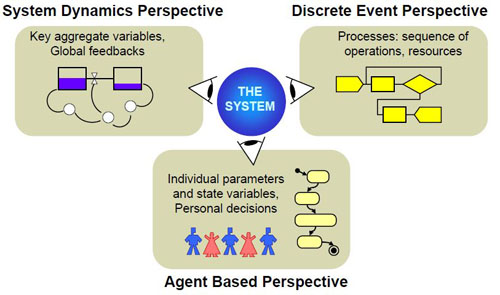
Three business simulation approaches

In 1998, the success of this research inspired the DCN laboratory to organize a company with the mission of developing a new generation of simulation software. Development emphasis was placed on applied methods: simulation, performance analysis, behavior of stochastic systems, optimization, and visualization. The resulting software was released in 2000 and featured the latest information technologies: an object-oriented approach, elements of the UML standard, the use of Java, and a modern GUI.

The tool was named AnyLogic because it supported all three well-known modeling approaches: system dynamics, discrete event simulation, agent-based modeling, and any combination of these approaches within a single model. The first version of AnyLogic was V4 because the numbering continues the numbering of COVERS 3.0.

AnyLogic 5 was released in 2003. The new version was focused on business simulation in different industries. AnyLogic 7 was released in 2014. It featured many updates aimed at simplifying model building, including support for multimethod modeling, a decreased need for coding, renewed libraries, and other usability improvements. AnyLogic 7.1, also released in 2014, included a new GIS implementation: in addition to shapefile-based maps, AnyLogic started to support tile maps from free online providers, including OpenStreetMap.

2015 marked the release of AnyLogiс 7.2 with the built-in database and the Fluid Library. Since 2015, AnyLogic Personal Learning Edition (PLE) has been available for free for the purposes of education and self-education. The PLE license is perpetual, but created models are limited in size.

The new Road Traffic Library was introduced in 2016 with AnyLogic 7.3.

AnyLogic 8 was released in 2017. Beginning with Version 8.0, the AnyLogic model development environment was integrated with AnyLogic Cloud, a web service for simulation analytics.

The platform for the AnyLogic 8 model development environment is Eclipse.

Starting with version 8.2, the software introduced dynamic imaging and improved GIS mapping. The Material Handling Library was added in version 8.3, providing advanced tools for simulating factories and warehouses. Subsequent versions continued to enhance these features, allowing for more complex and multi-level simulations, such as buildings and automated guided vehicle systems.

AnyLogic 8.4 and later versions further refined transport and material handling capabilities, including introducing transporters that move without guidance paths and more flexible conveyor systems. AnyLogic 8.7 expanded capabilities with overhead cranes, pedestrian area simulations with capacity restrictions, and support for social distancing rules.

With version 8.8, the transition to Java 11 streamlined the coding process, enhancing model creation and execution. AnyLogic 8.9 incorporated Git for better version control and introduced a memory dump analyzer for improved debugging. In AnyLogic 8.9.2, the NVIDIA Omniverse Connector was introduced, allowing users to link their simulations with detailed animations. This connection lets users export 3D models from AnyLogic to NVIDIA Omniverse, enhancing the visual quality and facilitating collaboration.

== AnyLogic and Java ==
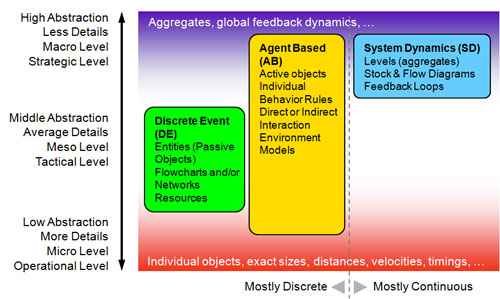
How simulation approaches correspond to the level of abstraction

AnyLogic includes a graphical modeling language and also allows the user to extend simulation models with Java code. The Java nature of AnyLogic lends itself to custom model extensions via Java coding

== Features ==
=== Simulation language ===
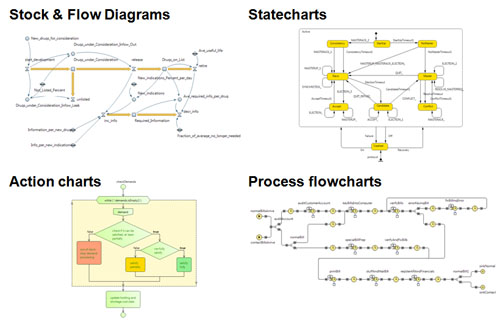
Simulation language constructions provided by AnyLogic

The AnyLogic simulation language consists of the following items:

- Stock & Flow Diagrams are used for System Dynamics modeling.
- Statecharts are used mostly in Agent Based modeling to define agent behavior. They are also often used in Discrete Event modeling, e.g. to simulate machine failure.
- Action charts are used to define algorithms. They may be used in Discrete Event modeling, e.g. for call routing, or in Agent Based modeling, e.g. for agent decision logic.
- Process flowcharts are the basic construction used to define processes in Discrete Event modeling. Looking at this flowchart you may see why the Discrete Event style is often called Process Centric.

The language also includes low-level modeling constructions (variables, equations, parameters, events etc.), presentation shapes (lines, polylines, ovals etc.), analysis facilities (datasets, histograms, plots), connectivity tools, standard images, and experiments frameworks.

=== AnyLogic libraries ===
AnyLogic includes the following standard libraries:

- The Process Modeling Library is designed to support DE simulation in Manufacturing, Supply Chain, Logistics and Healthcare areas. Using the Process Modeling Library objects you can model real-world systems in terms of entities (transactions, customers, products, parts, vehicles, etc.), processes (sequences of operations typically involving queues, delays, resource utilization), and resources. The processes are specified in the form of flowcharts. The Process Modeling Library is a successor of the Enterprise Library from AnyLogic 6, which is also available in AnyLogic 7.
- The Pedestrian Library is dedicated to simulating pedestrian flows in a physical environment. It allows you to create models of pedestrian-intensive buildings (like subway stations, security checks etc.) or streets (large numbers of pedestrians). Models support statistics collection on pedestrian density in different areas. This ensures the acceptable performance of service points with a hypothetical load, estimates lengths of stay in specific areas, and detects potential problems with interior geometry – such as the effect of adding too many obstacles – and other applications. In models created with the Pedestrian Library, pedestrians move in continuous space, reacting to different kinds of obstacles (walls, different kinds of areas), as well as other pedestrians. Pedestrians are simulated as interacting agents with complex behavior, but the AnyLogic Pedestrian Library provides a higher-level interface for the faster creation of pedestrian models in the style of flowcharts.
- The Rail Library supports modeling, simulating, and visualizing operations of a rail yard of any complexity and scale. The rail yard models can be combined with discrete event or agent based models related to: loading and unloading, resource allocation, maintenance, business processes, and other transportation activities.
- The Fluid Library allows the user to model storage and transfer of fluids, bulk goods, or large amounts of discrete items, which are not desirable to model as separate objects. The library includes blocks such as tank, pipeline, valve, and objects for routing, merging, and diverging the flow. To improve model execution speed, the Fluid Library uses a linear programming solver. The library is designed to improve AnyLogic use in manufacturing, oil, gas, and mining industries. The user can simulate oil pipes and tanks, ore, coal conveyors, and production processes where liquids or bulk materials are involved, for example, in concrete manufacturing.
- The Road Traffic Library allows users to simulate vehicle traffic on roads. The library supports detailed, physical level modeling of vehicle movement. Each vehicle represents an agent that can have its own behavioral patterns inside. The library allows users to simulate vehicle movement on roads, taking into account driving regulations, traffic lights, pedestrian crossings, priorities at junctions, parking lots, and public transport movements. The library is suitable for modeling highway traffic, street traffic, on-site transportation at manufacturing sites, or any other systems with vehicles, roads, and lanes. A special traffic density tool is included to help analyze road network loads.
- The Material Handling Library assists in process simulation in factories and warehouses. The library contains conveyors, transporters, and other elements simplifying the creation of detailed production models.

Besides these standard libraries, users can create their own ones and distribute them.

=== Model animation ===
AnyLogic supports interactive 2D and 3D animation. AnyLogic allows users to import CAD drawings as DXF files, and then visualize models on top of them. This feature can be used for animating processes inside objects like factories, warehouses, hospitals, etc. This functionality is mostly used in Discrete Event (process-based) models in manufacturing, healthcare, civil engineering, and construction. AnyLogic software also supports 3D animation and includes a collection of ready-to-use 3D objects for animation related to different industries, including buildings, road, rail, maritime, transport, energy, warehouse, hospital, equipment, airport-related items, supermarket-related items, cranes, and other objects.

Models can include custom UI for users to configure experiments and change input data.

=== Geospatial models, GIS integration ===
AnyLogiс models can use maps as a layout, which is often required by supply chains, logistics, and transportation industries. AnyLogic software supports the traditional shapefile-based map standard, SHP by Esri. In addition, AnyLogic supports tilemaps from free online providers, including OpenStreetMap. Tilemaps allow the modeler to use map data in models and to automatically create geospatial routes for agents. The main tilemap features in AnyLogic include:

- The model can access all of the data stored along with online-based maps: cities, regions, road networks, and objects (hospitals, schools, bus stops, etc.).
- Agents can be placed in specified points on the map, and moved along existing roads or routes.
- Users can create the required elements inside the model using the built-in search.

=== Model integration with other IT-infrastructure ===
An AnyLogic model can be exported as a Java application, that can be run separately, or integrated with other software. As an option, an exported AnyLogic model can be built into other pieces of software and work as an additional module to ERP, MRP, and TMS systems. Another typical use is integration of an AnyLogic model with TXT, MS Excel, or MS Access files and databases (MS SQL, MySQL, Oracle, etc.). Also, Anylogic models include their own databases based on HSQLDB.

== AnyLogic and AI ==
AnyLogic integrates artificial intelligence (AI) into its simulation platform. It allows users to train AI agents, incorporate machine learning models into simulations, and generate synthetic data for various purposes.

AnyLogic provides a reliable simulation environment for training AI agents using reinforcement learning. It enables the development of policies that can later be applied in real-world systems. This approach helps create AI agents that are better prepared to handle complex and dynamic scenarios.

Moreover, the platform supports embedding pre-trained machine learning (ML) models into simulations. This feature allows users to evaluate how these models perform within a system and make necessary adjustments. By testing AI solutions in a simulated setting, AnyLogic reduces risks and ensures smoother implementation in real-world systems.

AnyLogic can generate large amounts of synthetic data that is clean, well-structured, and labeled. This data is particularly useful for training machine learning models when real-world data is unavailable or unsuitable. It provides a practical solution for data-driven AI development.

=== Integration with AI Tools ===
AnyLogic works with several advanced AI tools to extend its capabilities. For example, it integrates with H2O, enabling the incorporation of powerful machine-learning techniques to achieve improved predictive power by combining advanced machine learning algorithms with AnyLogic's simulation tool.

Pypeline and ONNX Helper allow users to connect AnyLogic simulations with Python-based models or those stored in the ONNX format. With Pypeline, users can run Python scripts and functions directly within the simulation environment. On the other hand, ONNX is a standard that makes it easier to use and share models across various AI platforms.

Alpyne makes it possible to interact with AnyLogic models directly from Python, providing more control over reinforcement learning experiments. This tool is important for users developing complex AI strategies that require iterative testing and refinement. With Alpyne, users can export their simulation models from AnyLogic and manage them in Python.

== Multimethod simulation modeling ==
AnyLogic models can be based on any of the main simulation modeling paradigms: discrete event or process-centric (DE), systems dynamics (SD), and agent-based (AB).

System dynamics and discrete events are traditional simulation approaches, agent based is a newer one. Technically, the system dynamics approach deals mostly with continuous processes whereas discrete event and agent-based models work mostly in discrete time, i.e. jump from one event to another.

System dynamics dealing with aggregates is obviously used at the highest abstraction level. Discrete event modeling is used at low to middle abstraction. As for agent based modeling, this technology is used across all abstraction levels, and agent may model objects of very diverse nature and scale: at the "physical" level agents may be e.g. pedestrians or cars or robots, at the middle level – customers, at the highest level – competing companies.

AnyLogic allows the modeler to combine these simulation approaches within the same model. As an example, one could create a model of the package shipping industry where carriers are modeled as agents acting/reacting independently whereas the inner workings of their transport and infrastructure networks could be modeled with discrete event simulation. Similarly, one can model consumers as agents whose aggregate behavior feeds a systems dynamics model capturing flows such as revenues or costs which do not need to be tied to individual agents. This mixed language approach is directly applicable to a wide variety of complex modeling problems that may be modeled via any one approach albeit with compromises.

== AnyLogic Cloud ==
AnyLogic Cloud is a web service for simulation analytics. It allows users to store, access, run, and share simulation models online, as well as analyze experiment results.

Using the AnyLogic model development environment, developers can upload their models to AnyLogic Cloud and set up sharable web dashboards to work with models online. These dashboards can contain configurable input parameters and output data in the form of charts and graphs. Model users can set input data on the dashboard screen, run the model, and analyze the output.

AnyLogic Cloud allows users to run models using web browsers on desktop computers and mobile devices, with the model being executed on the server side. Multiple run experiments are performed using several nodes. The results of all executed experiments are stored in the database and can be immediately accessed. Models can be run both with and without HTML5-based interactive animation.

Developers can choose whether they want their models to be private or publicly available in the model library, which includes models from other AnyLogic users.

=== History ===
AnyLogic Cloud was introduced in 2017 with the release of AnyLogic 8.0. Further enhancements with AnyLogic 8.1 included new plotting capabilities, improved 3D animations, and tools for collaborative editing and community engagement within the Cloud.

The introduction of AnyLogic Private Cloud Lite with version 8.4 provided a simple, locally deployed option for organizations to share simulations privately. With continuous updates, including a more flexible AnyLogic Cloud API introduced in version 8.5, AnyLogic Cloud has evolved to support more dynamic and interactive simulation activities.

AnyLogic Cloud version 2.1.0 was released in 2020. It focused on improved versioning for Private Cloud to facilitate easy upgrades. Throughout 2020 and 2021, enhancements included the introduction of backup and restore tools, support for the HTTPS protocol in Private Cloud, and the ability for models to interact with native code via Java Native Interface.

In 2021, AnyLogic Cloud introduced access to the AnyLogic 9 technology preview for subscribers and performance enhancements for model galleries and model execution.

The year after, Cloud transitioned to Java 11 and Angular 13 for the web UI, alongside several security updates for third-party libraries to improve performance and fix vulnerabilities. Private Cloud instances gained the ability to manage user authentication via LDAP and Active Directory servers.

In 2023, updates included new experiment types such as Optimization and Optimization with replications, enhanced chart options, and significant improvements to the Private Cloud installation scripts and UI.

The updates in 2024, specifically version 2.4.1, introduced support for Java 17 and new animations.json configuration for Private Cloud. Following this, AnyLogic Cloud 2.5.0 brought significant improvements such as the new Completed Runs view and Single Sign-On (SSO) support, enhancing the user interface and security for both SaaS and Private Cloud users.

== anyLogistix supply chain optimization software ==
The AnyLogic Company converted its development efforts for the supply chain domain into a separate software tool—anyLogistix. This spin-off product was introduced in 2014 as AnyLogic Logistics Network Manager and was renamed anyLogistix in 2015.

anyLogistix is based on the AnyLogic and CPLEX engines, GIS, and the new industry-oriented GUI. It also includes algorithms and techniques specific to supply chain design and optimization. Like other simulation software, optimization functionality is provided by OptQuest. anyLogistix is fully integrated with AnyLogic, for instance, AnyLogic can be used for customization of objects inside anyLogistix, including warehouses, production sites, suppliers, inventory, sourcing, and transportation policies.

=== History ===
Since its launch in 2017, anyLogistix has consistently enhanced its supply chain design and analytics capabilities. Early versions introduced features such as IBM ILOG CPLEX® for optimized network configurations, dedicated fleets, and flexible transportation routing. Over time, significant functionalities were added, such as the Safety Stock Estimation and Capacitated Transport Optimization experiments, refining inventory management and delivery routes.

The introduction of anyLogistix Studio Edition streamlined extension development and facilitated the creation of digital twins, blending detailed modeling with real-time data. Versions like 2.13 and 2.15 emphasized network optimization, introducing database scenario import/export features to support collaboration and complex data integration.

The development team's focus shifted towards anyLogistix 3.0, launched in 2022, which transformed the software with a new tech stack, improved client-server architecture, and enhanced user experience.

This version allowed running experiments from browsers and provided cross-platform access, catering to Windows, macOS, and Linux users. Subsequent updates, like 3.1, introduced multi-user access and an API for integration, enhancing collaborative capabilities and performance for complex supply chain modeling projects.

anyLogistix 3.2, launched in 2024, introduced time windows for simulation modeling, which allowed users to set specific operating hours for each facility, making simulations more realistic. With the release of anyLogistix 3.3, new features were added, such as data grouping in tables and advanced visualization tools. This version also includes a new KPI metrics panel that helps users analyze performance more effectively by comparing different runs and viewing key metrics directly on the dashboard.

== See also ==
- Comparison of agent-based modeling software
- List of computer simulation software
- List of discrete event simulation software
- Computer simulation
