= DESMO-J =

Discrete event simulation library developed in Java

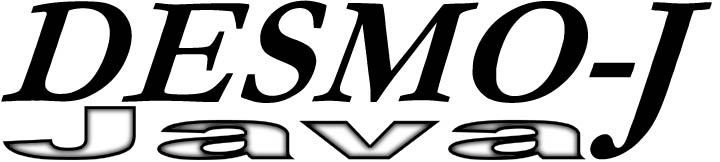
- Developer(s): University of Hamburg, Germany
- Initial release: 1999
- Stable release: 2.5.1e / March 24, 2017; 8 years ago
- Written in: Java
- Platform: Java platform
- Size: 5.2 MB
- Available in: English
- Type: Discrete event simulation library
- License: Apache License, version 2.0
- Website: desmoj.sourceforge.net

DESMO-J is a discrete event simulation library developed in Java.

== Overview ==
DESMO-J is an acronym for Discrete-Event Simulation Modelling in Java. DESMO-J allows for rapidly and flexibly building discrete event simulation models in Java, supporting both the event-oriented and process-oriented world view. DESMO-J provides a set of readily usable Java classes for stochastic distributions, static model components (like queues or resource synchronization), time representation and scheduling, experiment conduction and reporting. Supported by this simulation infrastructure, the user is free to concentrate on specifying the model's behaviour in terms of events or processes.

== Development ==
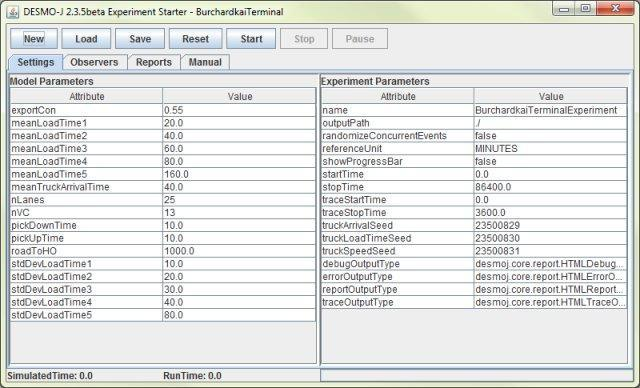
DESMO-J Simulation Framework, Screenshot Experiment GUI

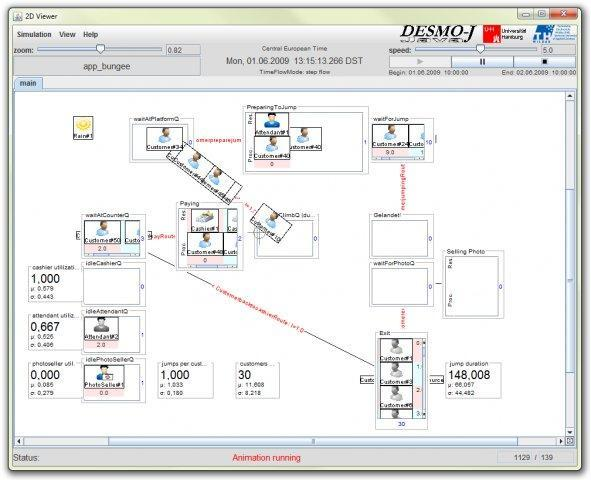
DESMO-J Simulation Framework, Screenshot of 2D animation

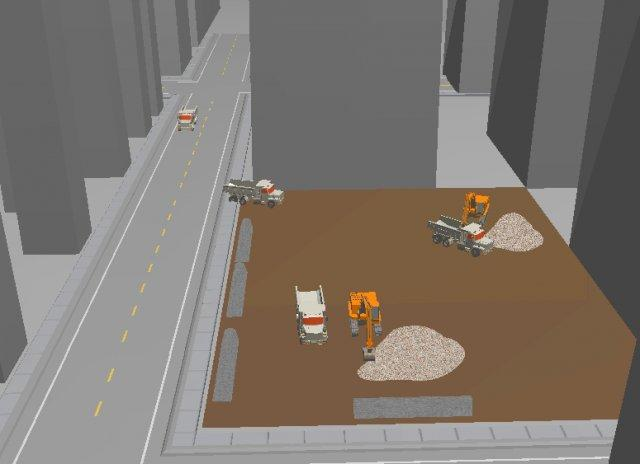
DESMO-J Simulation Framework, Screenshot of 3D visualization

DESMO-J has been developed at University of Hamburg's research group of Modelling and Simulation. First released in 1999, the environment continues to be maintained and kept up to date, now in terms of a SourceForge Project. DESMO-J's predecessor was DESMO, a Modula-2-based simulation library, which in turn was inspired by DEMOS, a system for discrete event modelling on Simula. A companion book has appeared 2005.

== Features ==
Besides providing a hybrid discrete event simulation environment able to process event as well as process model descriptions, key features of DESMO-J include:

- A GUI for experiment conduction
- 2D animation, based on icons and symbols
- 3D visualization, based on Java3d

Most real-world DESMO-J applications focus on manufacturing and logistics. DESMO-J is integrated into business process modelling tools like Borland Together or Intellivate IYOPRO, augmenting these tools with simulation functionality.

== See also ==
- Discrete event simulation
- List of discrete event simulation software
