= SimEvents =

Discrete event simulation tool developed by MathWorks

- SimEvents model showing resource allocation at an aircraft refueling facility
- Developer(s): MathWorks
- Stable release: 5.0 / March 3, 2016
- Operating system: Cross-platform
- Type: List of discrete event simulation software
- License: Proprietary
- Website: SimEvents

SimEvents is a discrete event simulation tool developed by MathWorks. It adds a library of graphical building blocks for modeling queuing systems to the Simulink environment. It also adds an event-based simulation engine to the time-based simulation engine in Simulink

== Capabilities ==
SimEvents provides a graphical drag-and-drop interface for building a discrete-event model.

It provides libraries of entity generators, random number generators, queues, servers, graphical displays and statistics reporting blocks.

Integration with MATLAB allows customization of the process flow in a SimEvents model. A MATLAB function can be developed to represent a task-scheduling sequence, routing of parts, or production recipes in a process flow. Since the two programs are within the same tools environment, it is straightforward to generate custom random distributions of input tasks, optimize a process, as well as to generate custom statistics.

SimEvents and Simulink can be used in the same simulation model to simulate hybrid or multi-domain systems that have both time-based and event-based components.

== See also ==
- Discrete event simulation
- List of discrete event simulation software
