= GoldSim =

- Developer: Datacor
- Stable release: 15R2 / March 5, 2026; 7 months ago
- Written in: C++
- Operating system: Windows
- Type: Simulation software
- License: Proprietary
- Website: www.goldsim.com

GoldSim is dynamic, probabilistic simulation software developed by GoldSim Technology Group. This general-purpose simulator is a hybrid of several simulation approaches, combining an extension of system dynamics with some aspects of discrete event simulation, and embedding the dynamic simulation engine within a Monte Carlo simulation framework.

While it is a general-purpose simulator, GoldSim has been most extensively used for environmental and engineering risk analysis, with applications in the areas of water resource management , mining , radioactive waste management , geological carbon sequestration , aerospace mission risk analysis and energy.

== History ==
In 1990, Golder Associates, an international engineering consulting firm, was asked by the United States Department of Energy (DOE) to develop probabilistic simulation software that could be used to help with decision support and management within the Office of Civilian Radioactive Waste Management. The results of this effort were two DOS-based programs (RIP and STRIP), which were used to support radioactive waste management projects within the DOE.

In 1996, in an effort funded by Golder Associates, the US DOE, the Japan Nuclear Cycle Development Institute (currently the Japan Atomic Energy Agency) and the Spanish National Radioactive Waste Company (ENRESA), the capabilities of RIP and STRIP were incorporated into a general purpose Windows-based simulator called GoldSim. Subsequent funding was also provided by NASA.

Initially only offered to the original funding organizations, GoldSim was released to the public in 2002. In 2004, GoldSim Technology Group LLC was spun off from Golder Associates as a wholly independent company. In March of 2026, GoldSim was acquired by Datacor.

Notable applications include providing the simulation framework for: 1) the Yucca Mountain Repository Performance Assessment model developed by Sandia National Laboratories; 2) a comprehensive system-level computational model for performance assessment of geological sequestration of CO_{2} developed by Los Alamos National Laboratory; 3) a flood operations model to help better understand and fine tune operations of a large dam used for water supply and flood control in Queensland, Australia; and 4) models for simulating risks associated with future crewed space missions by NASA Ames Research Center.

== Modeling Environment ==
GoldSim provides a visual and hierarchical modeling environment, which allows users to construct models by adding “elements” (model objects) that represent data, equations, processes or events, and linking them together into graphical representations that resemble influence diagrams. Influence arrows are automatically drawn as elements are referenced by other elements. Complex systems can be translated into hierarchical GoldSim models by creating layer of “containers” (or sub-models). Visual representations and hierarchical structures help users to build very large, complex models that can still be explained to interested stakeholders (e.g., government regulators, elected officials, and the public).

Though it is primarily a continuous simulator, GoldSim has a number of features typically associated with discrete simulators. By combining these two simulation methods, systems that are best represented using both continuous and discrete dynamics can often be more accurately simulated. Examples include tracking the quantity of water in a reservoir that is subject to both continuous inflows and outflows, as well as sudden storm events; and tracking the quantity of fuel in a space vehicle as it is subjected to random perturbations (e.g., component failures, extreme environmental conditions).

Because the software was originally developed for complex environmental applications, in which many inputs are uncertain and/or stochastic, in addition to being a dynamic simulator, GoldSim is a Monte Carlo simulator, such that inputs can be defined as distributions and the entire system simulated a large number of times to provide probabilistic outputs. As such, the software incorporates a number of computational features to facilitate probabilistic simulation of complex systems, including tools for generating and correlating stochastic time series, advanced sampling capabilities (including latin hypercube sampling, nested Monte Carlo analysis, and importance sampling), and support for distributed processing.

== See also ==
- Computer Simulation
- Monte Carlo Simulation
- List of computer simulation software
