= Simulation =

Imitation of the operation of a real-world process or system over time

A simulation is an imitative representation of a process or system that could exist in the real world. In this broad sense, simulation can often be used interchangeably with model. Sometimes a clear distinction between the two terms is made, in which simulations require the use of models; the model represents the key characteristics or behaviors of the selected system or process, whereas the simulation represents the evolution of the model over time. Another way to distinguish between the terms is to define simulation as experimentation with the help of a model. This definition includes time-independent simulations. Often, computers are used to execute the simulation.

Simulation is used in many contexts, such as simulation of technology for performance tuning or optimizing, safety engineering, testing, training, education, and video games. Simulation is also used with scientific modelling of natural systems or human systems to gain insight into their functioning, as in economics. Simulation can be used to show the eventual real effects of alternative conditions and courses of action. Simulation is also used when the real system cannot be engaged, because it may not be accessible, or it may be dangerous or unacceptable to engage, or it is being designed but not yet built, or it may simply not exist.

Key issues in modeling and simulation include the acquisition of valid sources of information about the relevant selection of key characteristics and behaviors used to build the model, the use of simplifying approximations and assumptions within the model, and the fidelity and validity of the simulation outcomes. Procedures and protocols for model verification and validation are an ongoing field of academic study, refinement, research and development in simulations technology or practice, particularly in the work of computer simulation.

== Classification and terminology ==
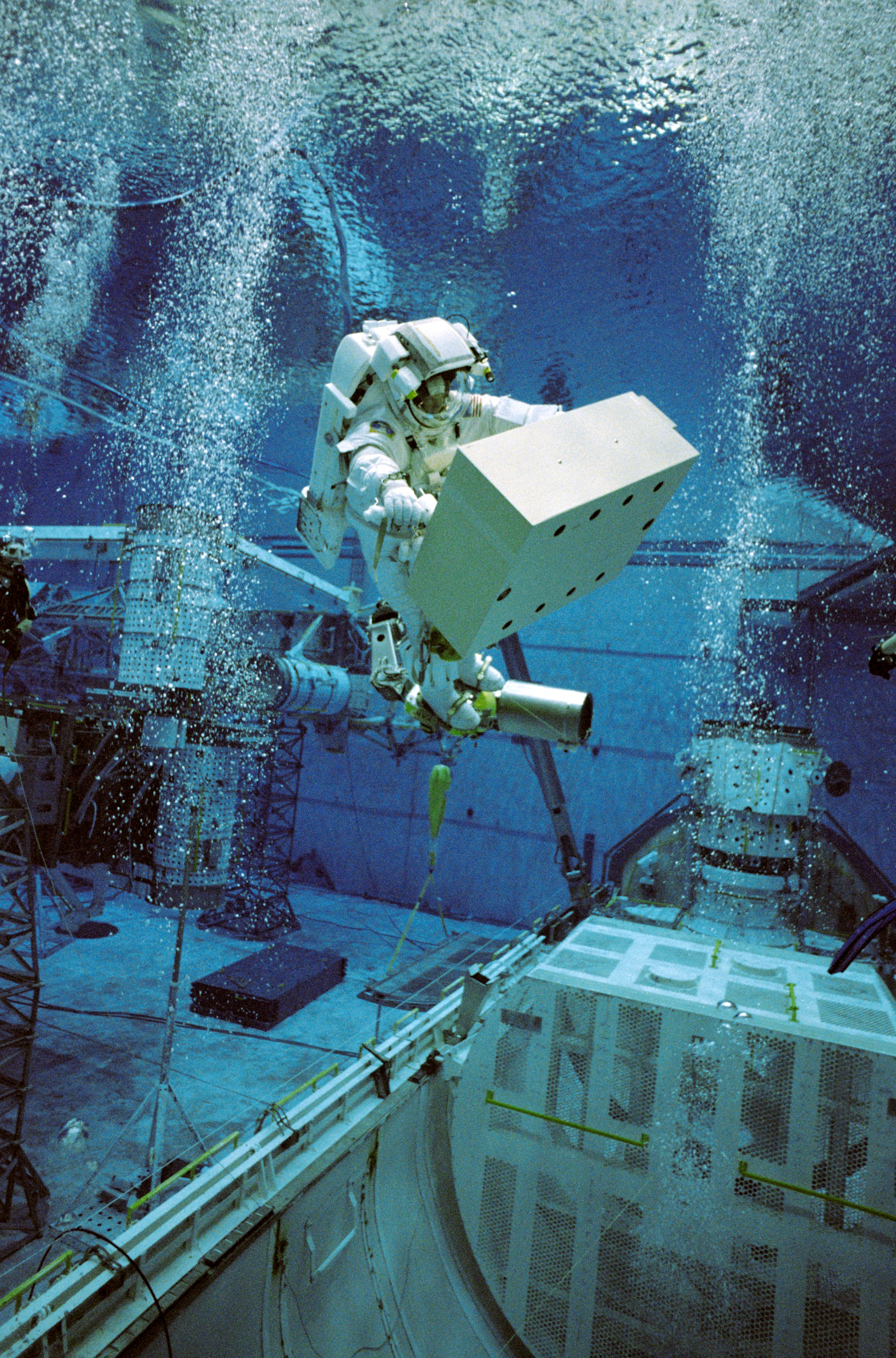
Human-in-the-loop simulation of outer space

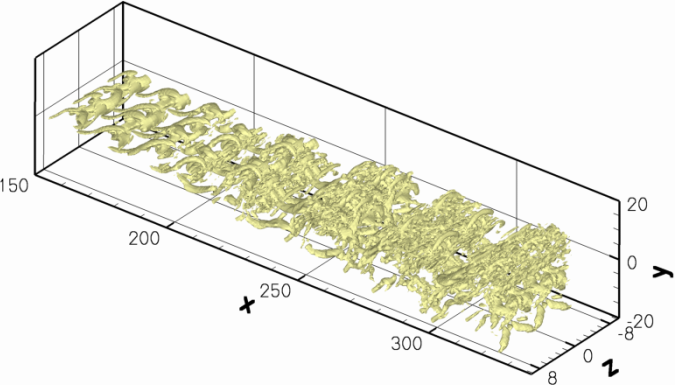
Visualization of a direct numerical simulation model

Historically, simulations used in different fields developed largely independently, but 20th-century studies of systems theory and cybernetics combined with the spreading use of computers across all those fields have led to some unification and a more systematic view of the concept.

Physical simulation refers to simulation in which physical objects are substituted for the real thing. These physical objects are often chosen because they are smaller or cheaper than the actual object or system. Alternatively, physical simulation may refer to computer simulations considering selected laws of physics, as in multiphysics simulation.

Interactive simulation is a special kind of physical simulation, often referred to as a human-in-the-loop simulation, in which physical simulations include human operators, such as in a flight simulator, sailing simulator, or driving simulator.

Continuous simulation is a simulation based on continuous-time rather than discrete-time steps, using numerical integration of differential equations.

Discrete-event simulation studies systems whose states change their values only at discrete times. For example, a simulation of an epidemic could change the number of infected people at time instants when susceptible individuals get infected or when infected individuals recover.

Stochastic simulation is a simulation where some variable or process is subject to random variations and is projected using Monte Carlo techniques using pseudo-random numbers. Thus replicated runs with the same boundary conditions will each produce different results within a specific confidence band.

Deterministic simulation is a simulation which is not stochastic: thus the variables are regulated by deterministic algorithms. So replicated runs from the same boundary conditions always produce identical results.

Hybrid simulation (or combined simulation) corresponds to a mix between continuous and discrete event simulation and results in integrating numerically the differential equations between two sequential events numerically to reduce the number of discontinuities.

A stand-alone simulation is a simulation running on a single workstation by itself.

A distributed simulation is one which uses more than one computer simultaneously, to guarantee access from/to different resources (e.g. multi-users operating different systems, or distributed data sets); a classical example is Distributed Interactive Simulation (DIS).

Parallel simulation speeds up a simulation's execution by concurrently distributing its workload over multiple processors, as in high-performance computing.

Interoperable simulation is where multiple models, simulators (often defined as federates) interoperate locally, distributed over a network; a classical example is High-Level Architecture.

Modeling and simulation as a service is where simulation is accessed as a service over the web.

Modeling, interoperable simulation and serious games is where serious game approaches (e.g. game engines and engagement methods) are integrated with interoperable simulation.

Simulation fidelity is used to describe the accuracy of a simulation and how closely it imitates the real-life counterpart. Fidelity is broadly classified as one of three categories: low, medium, and high. Specific descriptions of fidelity levels are subject to interpretation, but the following generalizations can be made:

- Low – the minimum simulation required for a system to respond to accept inputs and provide outputs
- Medium – responds automatically to stimuli, with limited accuracy
- High – nearly indistinguishable or as close as possible to the real system

A synthetic environment is a computer simulation that can be included in human-in-the-loop simulations. (Note: Thales defines synthetic environment as "the counterpart to simulated models of sensors, platforms and other active objects" for "the simulation of the external factors that affect them" while other vendors use the term for more visual, virtual reality-style simulators.)

Simulation in failure analysis refers to simulation in which we create environment/conditions to identify the cause of equipment failure. This can be the best and fastest method to identify the failure cause.

=== Data simulation ===
Data simulation creates artificial data to replicate the behavior of real-world data. The artificial data is generated using computer models or programs based on specific rules, patterns, or characteristics. This type of data is designed to imitate the operations of real systems, processes, or behaviors, enabling researchers and analysts to study and test scenarios without directly observing or collecting information from the real world.

== In computers ==
A computer simulation (or "sim") is an attempt to model a real-life or hypothetical situation on a computer so that it can be studied to see how the system works. By changing variables in the simulation, predictions may be made about the behaviour of the system. It is a tool to virtually investigate the behaviour of the system under study.

Example of computer simulation modeling a two body gravitational system

Computer simulation has become a useful part of modeling many natural systems in physics, chemistry and biology, and human systems in economics and social science (e.g., computational sociology) as well as in engineering to gain insight into the operation of those systems. A good example of the usefulness of using computers to simulate can be found in the field of network traffic simulation. In such simulations, the model behaviour will change each simulation according to the set of initial parameters assumed for the environment.

Traditionally, the formal modeling of systems has been via a mathematical model, which attempts to find analytical solutions enabling the prediction of the behaviour of the system from a set of parameters and initial conditions. Computer simulation is often used as an adjunct to, or substitution for, modeling systems for which simple closed form analytic solutions are not possible. There are many different types of computer simulation, the common feature they all share is the attempt to generate a sample of representative scenarios for a model in which a complete enumeration of all possible states would be prohibitive or impossible.

Several software packages exist for running computer-based simulation modeling (e.g. Monte Carlo simulation, stochastic modeling, multimethod modeling) that makes all the modeling almost effortless.

Modern usage of the term "computer simulation" may encompass virtually any computer-based representation.

=== Computer science ===
In computer science, simulation has some specialized meanings: Alan Turing used the term simulation to refer to what happens when a universal machine executes a state transition table (in modern terminology, a computer runs a program) that describes the state transitions, inputs and outputs of a subject discrete-state machine. The computer simulates the subject machine. Accordingly, in theoretical computer science the term simulation is a relation between state transition systems, useful in the study of operational semantics.

Less theoretically, an interesting application of computer simulation is to simulate computers using computers. In computer architecture, a type of simulator, typically called an emulator, is often used to execute a program that has to run on some inconvenient type of computer (for example, a newly designed computer that has not yet been built or an obsolete computer that is no longer available), or in a tightly controlled testing environment (see Computer architecture simulator and Platform virtualization). For example, simulators have been used to debug a microprogram or sometimes commercial application programs, before the program is downloaded to the target machine. Since the operation of the computer is simulated, all of the information about the computer's operation is directly available to the programmer, and the speed and execution of the simulation can be varied at will.

Simulators may also be used to interpret fault trees, or test VLSI logic designs before they are constructed. Symbolic simulation uses variables to stand for unknown values.

In the field of optimization, simulations of physical processes are often used in conjunction with evolutionary computation to optimize control strategies.

== In education and training ==
Military simulators pdf

Simulation is extensively used for educational purposes. It is used for cases where it is prohibitively expensive or simply too dangerous to allow trainees to use the real equipment in the real world. In such situations they will spend time learning valuable lessons in a "safe" virtual environment yet living a lifelike experience (or at least it is the goal). Often the convenience is to permit mistakes during training for a safety-critical system.

Simulations in education are somewhat like training simulations. They focus on specific tasks. The term 'microworld' is used to refer to educational simulations which model some abstract concept rather than simulating a realistic object or environment, or in some cases model a real-world environment in a simplistic way so as to help a learner develop an understanding of the key concepts. Normally, a user can create some sort of construction within the microworld that will behave in a way consistent with the concepts being modeled. Seymour Papert was one of the first to advocate the value of microworlds, and the Logo programming environment developed by Papert is one of the most well-known microworlds.

Project management simulation is increasingly used to train students and professionals in the art and science of project management. Using simulation for project management training improves learning retention and enhances the learning process.

Social simulations may be used in social science classrooms to illustrate social and political processes in anthropology, economics, history, political science, or sociology courses, typically at the high school or university level. These may, for example, take the form of civics simulations, in which participants assume roles in a simulated society, or international relations simulations in which participants engage in negotiations, alliance formation, trade, diplomacy, and the use of force. Such simulations might be based on fictitious political systems, or be based on current or historical events. An example of the latter would be Barnard College's Reacting to the Past series of historical educational games. The National Science Foundation has also supported the creation of reacting games that address science and math education. In social media simulations, participants train communication with critics and other stakeholders in a private environment.

In recent years, there has been increasing use of social simulations for staff training in aid and development agencies. The Carana simulation, for example, was first developed by the United Nations Development Programme, and is now used in a very revised form by the World Bank for training staff to deal with fragile and conflict-affected countries.

Military uses for simulation often involve aircraft or armoured fighting vehicles, but can also target small arms and other weapon systems training. Specifically, virtual firearms ranges have become the norm in most military training processes and there is a significant amount of data to suggest this is a useful tool for armed professionals.

== Virtual ==
A virtual simulation is a category of simulation that uses simulation equipment to create a simulated world for the user. Virtual simulations allow users to interact with a virtual world. Virtual worlds operate on platforms of integrated software and hardware components. In this manner, the system can accept input from the user (e.g., body tracking, voice/sound recognition, physical controllers) and produce output to the user (e.g., visual display, aural display, haptic display) . Virtual simulations use the aforementioned modes of interaction to produce a sense of immersion for the user.

=== Input hardware ===
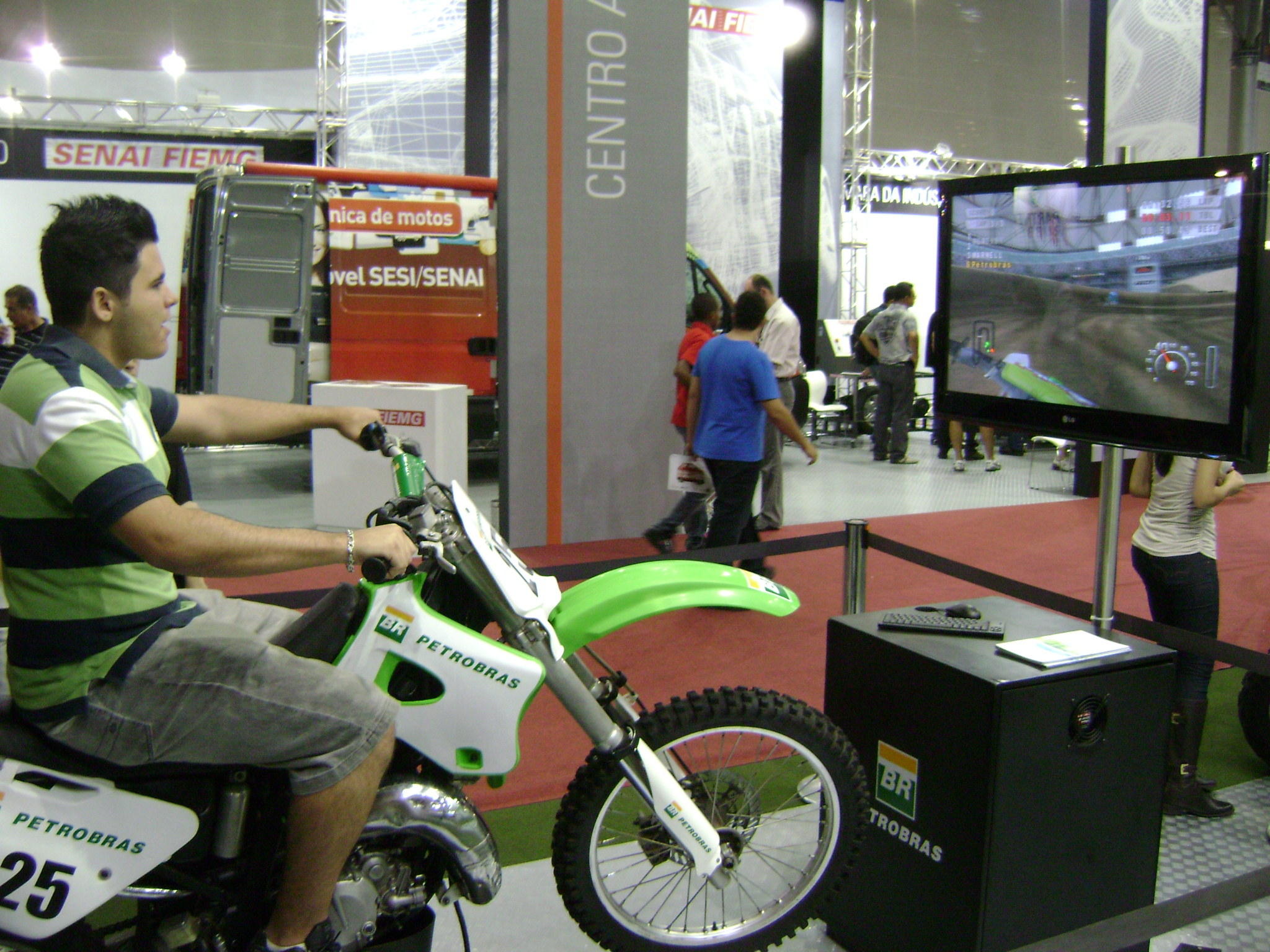
Motorcycle simulator of Bienal do Automóvel exhibition, in Belo Horizonte, Brazil

There is a wide variety of input hardware available to accept user input for virtual simulations. The following list briefly describes several of them:

- Body tracking: The motion capture method is often used to record the user's movements and translate the captured data into inputs for the virtual simulation. For example, if a user physically turns their head, the motion would be captured by the simulation hardware in some way and translated to a corresponding shift in view within the simulation.
  - Capture suits and/or gloves may be used to capture movements of users body parts. The systems may have sensors incorporated inside them to sense movements of different body parts (e.g., fingers). Alternatively, these systems may have exterior tracking devices or marks that can be detected by external ultrasound, optical receivers or electromagnetic sensors. Internal inertial sensors are also available on some systems. The units may transmit data either wirelessly or through cables.
  - Eye trackers can also be used to detect eye movements so that the system can determine precisely where a user is looking at any given instant.
- Physical controllers: Physical controllers provide input to the simulation only through direct manipulation by the user. In virtual simulations, tactile feedback from physical controllers is highly desirable in a number of simulation environments.
  - Omnidirectional treadmills can be used to capture the users locomotion as they walk or run.
  - High fidelity instrumentation such as instrument panels in virtual aircraft cockpits provides users with actual controls to raise the level of immersion. For example, pilots can use the actual global positioning system controls from the real device in a simulated cockpit to help them practice procedures with the actual device in the context of the integrated cockpit system.
- Voice/sound recognition: This form of interaction may be used either to interact with agents within the simulation (e.g., virtual people) or to manipulate objects in the simulation (e.g., information). Voice interaction presumably increases the level of immersion for the user.
  - Users may use headsets with boom microphones, lapel microphones or the room may be equipped with strategically located microphones.

==== Research into user input systems ====
Systems such as brain–computer interfaces (BCIs) offer the ability to further increase the level of immersion for virtual simulation users, where naïve subjects could be trained to use a BCI to navigate a virtual apartment with relative ease.

=== Output hardware ===
There is a wide variety of output hardware available to deliver stimuli to users in virtual simulations. The following list briefly describes several of them:

- Visual display: Visual displays provide the visual stimulus to the user.
  - Stationary displays can vary from a conventional desktop display to 360-degree wrap-around screens to stereo three-dimensional screens. Conventional desktop displays can vary in size from 15 to 60 inches (380 to 1,520 mm). Wrap around screens is typically used in what is known as a cave automatic virtual environment (CAVE). Stereo three-dimensional screens produce three-dimensional images either with or without special glasses—depending on the design.
  - Head-mounted displays (HMDs) have small displays that are mounted on headgear worn by the user. These systems are connected directly into the virtual simulation to provide the user with a more immersive experience. Weight, update rates and field of view are some of the key variables that differentiate HMDs. Naturally, heavier HMDs are undesirable as they cause fatigue over time. If the update rate is too slow, the system is unable to update the displays fast enough to correspond with a quick head turn by the user. Slower update rates tend to cause simulation sickness and disrupt the sense of immersion. Field of view or the angular extent of the world that is seen at a given moment field of view can vary from system to system and has been found to affect the user's sense of immersion.
- Aural display: Several different types of audio systems exist to help the user hear and localize sounds spatially. Special software can be used to produce 3D audio effects 3D audio to create the illusion that sound sources are placed within a defined three-dimensional space around the user.
  - Stationary conventional speaker systems may be used to provide dual or multi-channel surround sound. However, external speakers are not as effective as headphones in producing 3D audio effects.
  - Conventional headphones offer a portable alternative to stationary speakers. They also have the added advantages of masking real-world noise and facilitate more effective 3D audio sound effects.
- Haptic display: These displays provide a sense of touch to the user (haptic technology). This type of output is sometimes referred to as force feedback.
  - Tactile tile displays use different types of actuators such as inflatable bladders, vibrators, low-frequency sub-woofers, pin actuators and/or thermo-actuators to produce sensations for the user.
  - End effector displays can respond to users inputs with resistance and force. These systems are often used in medical applications for remote surgeries that employ robotic instruments.
- Vestibular display: These displays provide a sense of motion to the user (motion simulator). They often manifest as motion bases for virtual vehicle simulation such as driving simulators or flight simulators. Motion bases are fixed in place but use actuators to move the simulator in ways that can produce the sensations pitching, yawing or rolling. The simulators can also move in such a way as to produce a sense of acceleration on all axes (e.g., the motion base can produce the sensation of falling).

== Clinical healthcare ==
Clinical healthcare simulators are increasingly being developed and deployed to teach therapeutic and diagnostic procedures as well as medical concepts and decision making to personnel in the health professions. Simulators have been developed for training procedures ranging from the basics such as blood draw, to laparoscopic surgery and trauma care. They are also important to help on prototyping new devices for biomedical engineering problems. Currently, simulators are applied to research and develop tools for new therapies, treatments and early diagnosis in medicine.

Many medical simulators involve a computer connected to a plastic simulation of the relevant anatomy. Sophisticated simulators of this type employ a life-size mannequin that responds to injected drugs and can be programmed to create simulations of life-threatening emergencies.

In other simulations, visual components of the procedure are reproduced by computer graphics techniques, while touch-based components are reproduced by haptic feedback devices combined with physical simulation routines computed in response to the user's actions. Medical simulations of this sort will often use 3D CT or MRI scans of patient data to enhance realism. Some medical simulations are developed to be widely distributed (such as web-enabled simulations and procedural simulations that can be viewed via standard web browsers) and can be interacted with using standard computer interfaces, such as the keyboard and mouse.

=== Placebo ===
An important medical application of a simulator—although, perhaps, denoting a slightly different meaning of simulator—is the use of a placebo drug, a formulation that simulates the active drug in trials of drug efficacy.

=== Improving patient safety ===
Simulation is used to study patient safety, as well as train medical professionals. Studying patient safety and safety interventions in healthcare is challenging, because there is a lack of experimental control (i.e., patient complexity, system/process variances) to see if an intervention made a meaningful difference (Groves & Manges, 2017). An example of innovative simulation to study patient safety is from nursing research. Groves et al. (2016) used a high-fidelity simulation to examine nursing safety-oriented behaviors during times such as change-of-shift report.

However, the value of simulation interventions to translating to clinical practice are is still debatable. As Nishisaki states, "there is good evidence that simulation training improves provider and team self-efficacy and competence on manikins. There is also good evidence that procedural simulation improves actual operational performance in clinical settings." However, there is a need to have improved evidence to show that crew resource management training through simulation. One of the largest challenges is showing that team simulation improves team operational performance at the bedside. Although evidence that simulation-based training actually improves patient outcome has been slow to accrue, today the ability of simulation to provide hands-on experience that translates to the operating room is no longer in doubt.

One of the largest factors that might impact the ability to have training impact the work of practitioners at the bedside is the ability to empower frontline staff (Stewart, Manges, Ward, 2015).

=== History in healthcare ===
The first medical simulators were simple models of human patients.

Since antiquity, these representations in clay and stone were used to demonstrate clinical features of disease states and their effects on humans. Models have been found in many cultures and continents. These models have been used in some cultures (e.g., Chinese culture) as a "diagnostic" instrument, allowing women to consult male physicians while maintaining social laws of modesty. Models are used today to help students learn the anatomy of the musculoskeletal system and organ systems.

In 2002, the Society for Simulation in Healthcare (SSH) was formed to become a leader in international interprofessional advances the application of medical simulation in healthcare

The need for a "uniform mechanism to educate, evaluate, and certify simulation instructors for the health care profession" was recognized by McGaghie et al. in their critical review of simulation-based medical education research. In 2012 the SSH piloted two new certifications to provide recognition to educators in an effort to meet this need.

=== Type of models ===
==== Active models ====
Active models that attempt to reproduce living anatomy or physiology are recent developments. The famous "Harvey" mannequin was developed at the University of Miami and is able to recreate many of the physical findings of the cardiology examination, including palpation, auscultation, and electrocardiography.

==== Interactive models ====
More recently, interactive models have been developed that respond to actions taken by a student or physician. Until recently, these simulations were two dimensional computer programs that acted more like a textbook than a patient. Computer simulations have the advantage of allowing a student to make judgments, and also to make errors. The process of iterative learning through assessment, evaluation, decision making, and error correction creates a much stronger learning environment than passive instruction.

==== Computer simulators ====
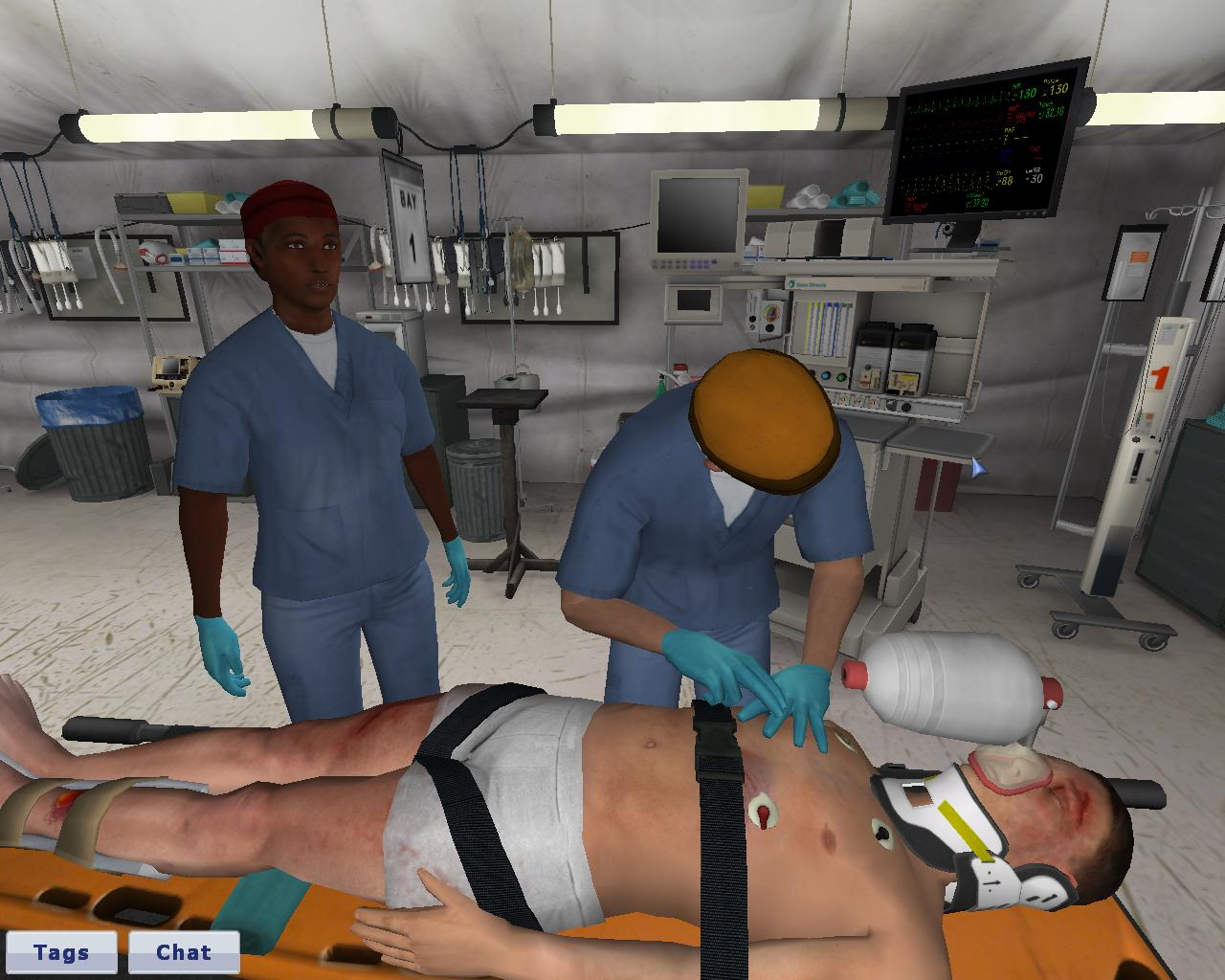
3DiTeams learner is percussing the patient's chest in virtual field hospital.

Simulators have been proposed as an ideal tool for assessment of students for clinical skills. For patients, "cybertherapy" can be used for sessions simulating traumatic experiences, from fear of heights to social anxiety.

Programmed patients and simulated clinical situations, including mock disaster drills, have been used extensively for education and evaluation. These "lifelike" simulations are expensive, and lack reproducibility. A fully functional "3Di" simulator would be the most specific tool available for teaching and measurement of clinical skills. Gaming platforms have been applied to create these virtual medical environments to create an interactive method for learning and application of information in a clinical context.

Immersive disease state simulations allow a doctor or HCP to experience what a disease actually feels like. Using sensors and transducers, symptomatic effects can be delivered to a participant, allowing them to experience the patient’s disease state.

Such a simulator meets the goals of an objective and standardized examination for clinical competence. This system is superior to examinations that use "standard patients" because it permits the quantitative measurement of competence, as well as reproducing the same objective findings.

== In entertainment ==
Simulation in entertainment encompasses many large and popular industries such as film, television, video games (including serious games) and rides in theme parks. Although modern simulation is thought to have its roots in training and the military, in the 20th century it also became a conduit for enterprises which were more hedonistic in nature.

=== History in film and games ===
==== Early history (1940s and 1950s) ====
The first simulation game may have been created as early as 1947 by Thomas T. Goldsmith Jr. and Estle Ray Mann. This was a straightforward game that simulated a missile being fired at a target. The curve of the missile and its speed could be adjusted using several knobs. In 1958, a computer game called Tennis for Two was created by Willy Higginbotham which simulated a tennis game between two players who could both play at the same time using hand controls and was displayed on an oscilloscope. This was one of the first electronic video games to use a graphical display.

==== 1970s and early 1980s ====
Computer-generated imagery was used in the film to simulate objects as early as 1972 in A Computer Animated Hand, parts of which were shown on the big screen in the 1976 film Futureworld. This was followed by the "targeting computer" that young Skywalker turns off in the 1977 film Star Wars.

The film Tron (1982) was the first film to use computer-generated imagery for more than a couple of minutes.

Advances in technology in the 1980s caused 3D simulation to become more widely used and it began to appear in movies and in computer-based games such as Atari's Battlezone (1980) and Acornsoft's Elite (1984), one of the first wire-frame 3D graphics games for home computers.

==== Pre-virtual cinematography era (early 1980s to 1990s) ====
Advances in technology in the 1980s made the computer more affordable and more capable than they were in previous decades, which facilitated the rise of computer such as the Xbox gaming. The first video game consoles released in the 1970s and early 1980s fell prey to the industry crash in 1983, but in 1985, Nintendo released the Nintendo Entertainment System (NES) which became one of the best selling consoles in video game history. In the 1990s, computer games became widely popular with the release of such game as The Sims and Command & Conquer and the still increasing power of desktop computers. Today, computer simulation games such as World of Warcraft are played by millions of people around the world.

In 1993, the film Jurassic Park became the first popular film to use computer-generated graphics extensively, integrating the simulated dinosaurs almost seamlessly into live action scenes.

This event transformed the film industry; in 1995, the film Toy Story was the first film to use only computer-generated images and by the new millennium computer generated graphics were the leading choice for special effects in films.

==== Virtual cinematography (early 2000s–present) ====
The advent of virtual cinematography in the early 2000s has led to an explosion of movies that would have been impossible to shoot without it. Classic examples are the digital look-alikes of Neo, Smith and other characters in the Matrix sequels and the extensive use of physically impossible camera runs in The Lord of the Rings trilogy.

The terminal in the Pan Am (TV series) no longer existed during the filming of this 2011–2012 aired series, which was no problem as they created it in virtual cinematography using automated viewpoint finding and matching in conjunction with compositing real and simulated footage, which has been the bread and butter of the movie artist in and around film studios since the early 2000s.

Computer-generated imagery is "the application of the field of 3D computer graphics to special effects". This technology is used for visual effects because they are high in quality, controllable, and can create effects that would not be feasible using any other technology either because of cost, resources or safety. Computer-generated graphics can be seen in many live-action movies today, especially those of the action genre. Further, computer-generated imagery has almost completely supplanted hand-drawn animation in children's movies which are increasingly computer-generated only. Examples of movies that use computer-generated imagery include Finding Nemo, 300 and Iron Man.

=== Examples of non-film entertainment simulation ===
==== Games ====
Simulation games, as opposed to other genres of video and computer games, represent or simulate an environment accurately. Moreover, they represent the interactions between the playable characters and the environment realistically. These kinds of games are usually more complex in terms of gameplay. Simulation games have become incredibly popular among people of all ages. Popular simulation games include SimCity and Tiger Woods PGA Tour. There are also flight simulator and driving simulator games.

==== Theme park rides ====
Simulators have been used for entertainment since the Link Trainer in the 1930s. The first modern simulator ride to open at a theme park was Disney's Star Tours in 1987 soon followed by Universal's The Funtastic World of Hanna-Barbera in 1990 which was the first ride to be done entirely with computer graphics.

Simulator rides are the progeny of military training simulators and commercial simulators, but they are different in a fundamental way. While military training simulators react realistically to the input of the trainee in real time, ride simulators only feel like they move realistically and move according to prerecorded motion scripts. One of the first simulator rides, Star Tours, which cost $32 million, used a hydraulic motion based cabin. The movement was programmed by a joystick. Today's simulator rides, such as The Amazing Adventures of Spider-Man include elements to increase the amount of immersion experienced by the riders such as: 3D imagery, physical effects (spraying water or producing scents), and movement through an environment.

== In Manufacturing ==
Manufacturing simulation represents one of the most important applications of simulation. This technique represents a valuable tool used by engineers when evaluating the effect of capital investment in equipment and physical facilities like factory plants, warehouses, and distribution centers. Simulation can be used to predict the performance of an existing or planned system and to compare alternative solutions for a particular design problem.

Another important goal of simulation in manufacturing systems is to quantify system performance. Common measures of system performance include the following:

- Throughput under average and peak loads
- System cycle time (how long it takes to produce one part)
- Use of resource, labor, and machines
- Bottlenecks and choke points
- Queuing at work locations
- Queuing and delays caused by material-handling devices and systems
- WIP storages needs
- Staffing requirements
- Effectiveness of scheduling systems
- Effectiveness of control systems

== More examples ==
=== Automobiles ===
An automobile simulator provides an opportunity to reproduce the characteristics of real vehicles in a virtual environment. It replicates the external factors and conditions with which a vehicle interacts enabling a driver to feel as if they are sitting in the cab of their own vehicle. Scenarios and events are replicated with sufficient reality to ensure that drivers become fully immersed in the experience rather than simply viewing it as an educational experience.

The simulator provides a constructive experience for the novice driver and enables more complex exercises to be undertaken by the more mature driver. For novice drivers, truck simulators provide an opportunity to begin their career by applying best practice. For mature drivers, simulation provides the ability to enhance good driving or to detect poor practice and to suggest the necessary steps for remedial action. For companies, it provides an opportunity to educate staff in the driving skills that achieve reduced maintenance costs, improved productivity and, most importantly, to ensure the safety of their actions in all possible situations.

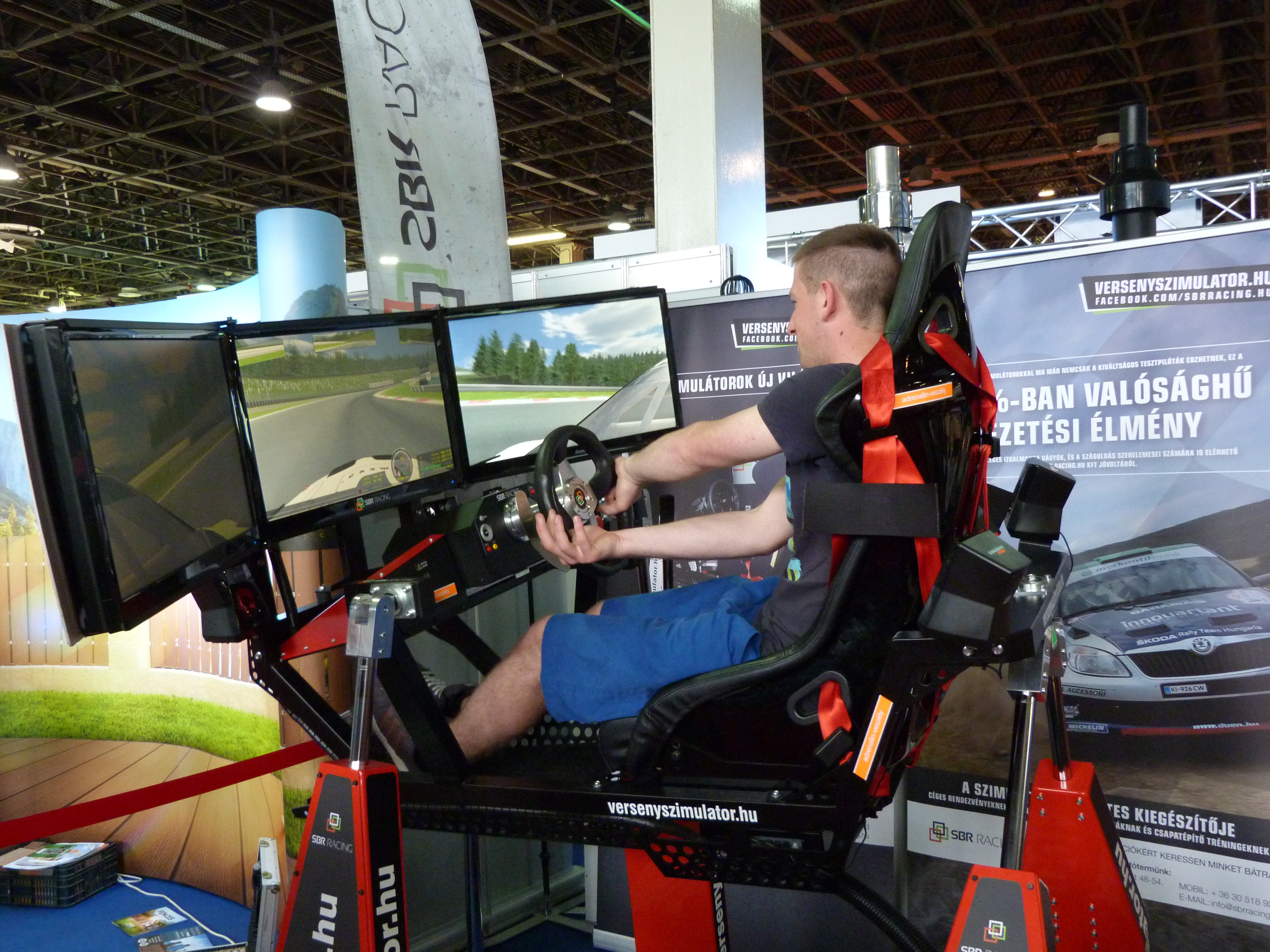
Car racing simulator

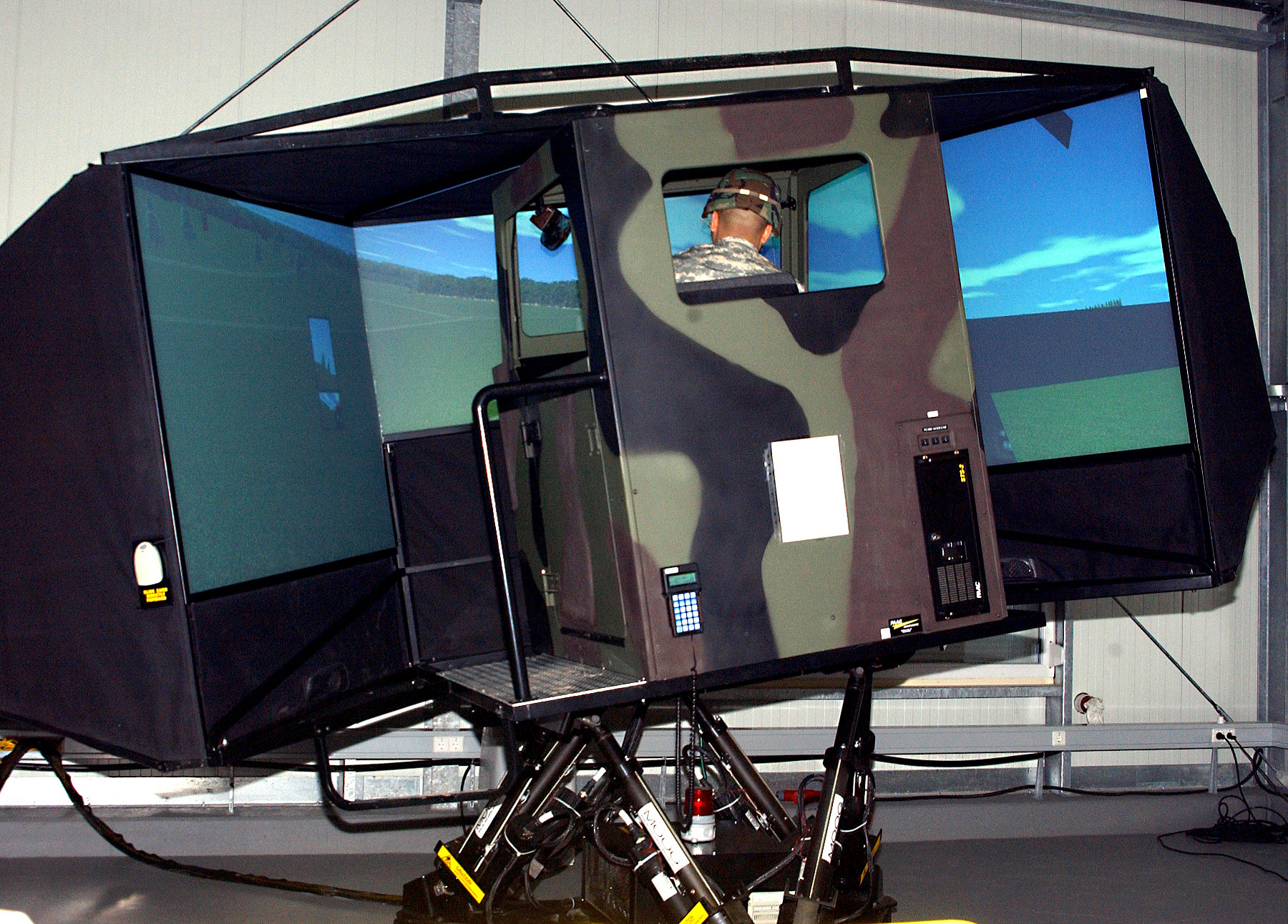
A soldier tests out a heavy-wheeled-vehicle driving simulator.

=== Biomechanics ===
A biomechanics simulator is a simulation platform for creating dynamic mechanical models built from combinations of rigid and deformable bodies, joints, constraints, and various force actuators. It is specialized for creating biomechanical models of human anatomical structures, with the intention to study their function and eventually assist in the design and planning of medical treatment.

A biomechanics simulator is used to analyze walking dynamics, study sports performance, simulate surgical procedures, analyze joint loads, design medical devices, and animate human and animal movement.

A neuromechanical simulator combines biomechanical and biologically realistic neural network simulation. It allows the user to test hypotheses about the neural basis of behavior in a physically accurate 3D virtual environment.

=== City and urban ===
A city simulator can be a city-building game but can also be a tool used by urban planners to understand how cities are likely to evolve in response to various policy decisions. AnyLogic is an example of modern, large-scale urban simulators designed for use by urban planners. City simulators are generally agent-based simulations with explicit representations for land use and transportation. UrbanSim and LEAM are examples of large-scale urban simulation models that are used by metropolitan planning agencies and military bases for land use and transportation planning.

=== Christmas ===
Several Christmas-themed simulations exist, many of which are centered around Santa Claus. An example of these simulations are websites which claim to allow the user to track Santa Claus. Due to the fact that Santa is a legendary character and not a real, living person, it is impossible to provide actual information on his location, and services such as NORAD Tracks Santa and the Google Santa Tracker (the former of which claims to use radar and other technologies to track Santa) display fake, predetermined location information to users. Another example of these simulations are websites that claim to allow the user to email or send messages to Santa Claus. Websites such as emailSanta.com or Santa's former page on the now-defunct Windows Live Spaces by Microsoft use automated programs or scripts to generate personalized replies claimed to be from Santa himself based on user input.

=== Communication satellites ===
Modern satellite communications systems (SATCOM) are often large and complex with many interacting parts and elements. In addition, the need for broadband connectivity on a moving vehicle has increased dramatically in the past few years for both commercial and military applications. To accurately predict and deliver high quality of service, SATCOM system designers have to factor in terrain as well as atmospheric and meteorological conditions in their planning. To deal with such complexity, system designers and operators increasingly turn towards computer models of their systems to simulate real-world operating conditions and gain insights into usability and requirements prior to final product sign-off. Modeling improves the understanding of the system by enabling the SATCOM system designer or planner to simulate real-world performance by injecting the models with multiple hypothetical atmospheric and environmental conditions. Simulation is often used in the training of civilian and military personnel. This usually occurs when it is prohibitively expensive or simply too dangerous to allow trainees to use the real equipment in the real world. In such situations, they will spend time learning valuable lessons in a "safe" virtual environment yet living a lifelike experience (or at least it is the goal). Often the convenience is to permit mistakes during training for a safety-critical system.

=== Digital lifecycle ===
Simulation of airflow over an engine

Simulation solutions are being increasingly integrated with computer-aided solutions and processes (computer-aided design or CAD, computer-aided manufacturing or CAM, computer-aided engineering or CAE, etc.). The use of simulation throughout the product lifecycle, especially at the earlier concept and design stages, has the potential of providing substantial benefits. These benefits range from direct cost issues such as reduced prototyping and shorter time-to-market to better performing products and higher margins. However, for some companies, simulation has not provided the expected benefits.

The successful use of simulation, early in the lifecycle, has been largely driven by increased integration of simulation tools with the entire set of CAD, CAM and product-lifecycle management solutions. Simulation solutions can now function across the extended enterprise in a multi-CAD environment, and include solutions for managing simulation data and processes and ensuring that simulation results are made part of the product lifecycle history.

=== Disaster preparedness ===
Simulation training has become a method for preparing people for disasters. Simulations can replicate emergency situations and track how learners respond thanks to a lifelike experience. Disaster preparedness simulations can involve training on how to handle terrorism attacks, natural disasters, pandemic outbreaks, or other life-threatening emergencies.

One organization that has used simulation training for disaster preparedness is CADE (Center for Advancement of Distance Education). CADE has used a video game to prepare emergency workers for multiple types of attacks. As reported by News-Medical.Net, "The video game is the first in a series of simulations to address bioterrorism, pandemic flu, smallpox, and other disasters that emergency personnel must prepare for." Developed by a team from the University of Illinois at Chicago (UIC), the game allows learners to practice their emergency skills in a safe, controlled environment.

The Emergency Simulation Program (ESP) at the British Columbia Institute of Technology (BCIT), Vancouver, British Columbia, Canada is another example of an organization that uses simulation to train for emergency situations. ESP uses simulation to train on the following situations: forest fire fighting, oil or chemical spill response, earthquake response, law enforcement, municipal firefighting, hazardous material handling, military training, and response to terrorist attack One feature of the simulation system is the implementation of "Dynamic Run-Time Clock," which allows simulations to run a 'simulated' time frame, "'speeding up' or 'slowing down' time as desired" Additionally, the system allows session recordings, picture-icon based navigation, file storage of individual simulations, multimedia components, and launch external applications.

At the University of Québec in Chicoutimi, a research team at the outdoor research and expertise laboratory (Laboratoire d'Expertise et de Recherche en Plein Air – LERPA) specializes in using wilderness backcountry accident simulations to verify emergency response coordination.

Instructionally, the benefits of emergency training through simulations are that learner performance can be tracked through the system. This allows the developer to make adjustments as necessary or alert the educator on topics that may require additional attention. Other advantages are that the learner can be guided or trained on how to respond appropriately before continuing to the next emergency segment—this is an aspect that may not be available in the live environment. Some emergency training simulators also allow for immediate feedback, while other simulations may provide a summary and instruct the learner to engage in the learning topic again.

In a live-emergency situation, emergency responders do not have time to waste. Simulation-training in this environment provides an opportunity for learners to gather as much information as they can and practice their knowledge in a safe environment. They can make mistakes without risk of endangering lives and be given the opportunity to correct their errors to prepare for the real-life emergency.

=== Economics ===
Simulations in economics and especially in macroeconomics, judge the desirability of the effects of proposed policy actions, such as fiscal policy changes or monetary policy changes. A mathematical model of the economy, having been fitted to historical economic data, is used as a proxy for the actual economy; proposed values of government spending, taxation, open market operations, etc. are used as inputs to the simulation of the model, and various variables of interest such as the inflation rate, the unemployment rate, the balance of trade deficit, the government budget deficit, etc. are the outputs of the simulation. The simulated values of these variables of interest are compared for different proposed policy inputs to determine which set of outcomes is most desirable.

=== Engineering, technology, and processes ===
Simulation is an important feature in engineering systems or any system that involves many processes. For example, in electrical engineering, delay lines may be used to simulate propagation delay and phase shift caused by an actual transmission line. Similarly, dummy loads may be used to simulate impedance without simulating propagation and is used in situations where propagation is unwanted. A simulator may imitate only a few of the operations and functions of the unit it simulates. Contrast with: emulate.

Most engineering simulations entail mathematical modeling and computer-assisted investigation. There are many cases, however, where mathematical modeling is not reliable. Simulation of fluid dynamics problems often require both mathematical and physical simulations. In these cases the physical models require dynamic similitude. Physical and chemical simulations have also direct realistic uses, rather than research uses; in chemical engineering, for example, process simulations are used to give the process parameters immediately used for operating chemical plants, such as oil refineries. Simulators are also used for plant operator training. It is called Operator Training Simulator (OTS) and has been widely adopted by many industries from chemical to oil&gas and to the power industry. This created a safe and realistic virtual environment to train board operators and engineers. Mimic is capable of providing high fidelity dynamic models of nearly all chemical plants for operator training and control system testing.

=== Ergonomics ===
Ergonomic simulation involves the analysis of virtual products or manual tasks within a virtual environment. In the engineering process, the aim of ergonomics is to develop and to improve the design of products and work environments. Ergonomic simulation utilizes an anthropometric virtual representation of the human, commonly referenced as a mannequin or Digital Human Models (DHMs), to mimic the postures, mechanical loads, and performance of a human operator in a simulated environment such as an airplane, automobile, or manufacturing facility. DHMs are recognized as evolving and valuable tool for performing proactive ergonomics analysis and design. The simulations employ 3D-graphics and physics-based models to animate the virtual humans. Ergonomics software uses inverse kinematics (IK) capability for posing the DHMs.

Software tools typically calculate biomechanical properties including individual muscle forces, joint forces and moments. Most of these tools employ standard ergonomic evaluation methods such as the NIOSH lifting equation and Rapid Upper Limb Assessment (RULA). Some simulations also analyze physiological measures including metabolism, energy expenditure, and fatigue limits Cycle time studies, design and process validation, user comfort, reachability, and line of sight are other human-factors that may be examined in ergonomic simulation packages.

Modeling and simulation of a task can be performed by manually manipulating the virtual human in the simulated environment. Some ergonomics simulation software permits interactive, real-time simulation and evaluation through actual human input via motion capture technologies. However, motion capture for ergonomics requires expensive equipment and the creation of props to represent the environment or product.

Some applications of ergonomic simulation in include analysis of solid waste collection, disaster management tasks, interactive gaming, automotive assembly line, virtual prototyping of rehabilitation aids, and aerospace product design. Ford engineers use ergonomics simulation software to perform virtual product design reviews. Using engineering data, the simulations assist evaluation of assembly ergonomics. The company uses Siemen's Jack and Jill ergonomics simulation software in improving worker safety and efficiency, without the need to build expensive prototypes.

=== Finance ===
In finance, computer simulations are often used for scenario planning. Risk-adjusted net present value, for example, is computed from well-defined but not always known (or fixed) inputs. By imitating the performance of the project under evaluation, simulation can provide a distribution of NPV over a range of discount rates and other variables. Simulations are also often used to test a financial theory or the ability of a financial model.

Simulations are frequently used in financial training to engage participants in experiencing various historical as well as fictional situations. There are stock market simulations, portfolio simulations, risk management simulations or models and forex simulations. Such simulations are typically based on stochastic asset models. Using these simulations in a training program allows for the application of theory into a something akin to real life. As with other industries, the use of simulations can be technology or case-study driven.

=== Flight ===
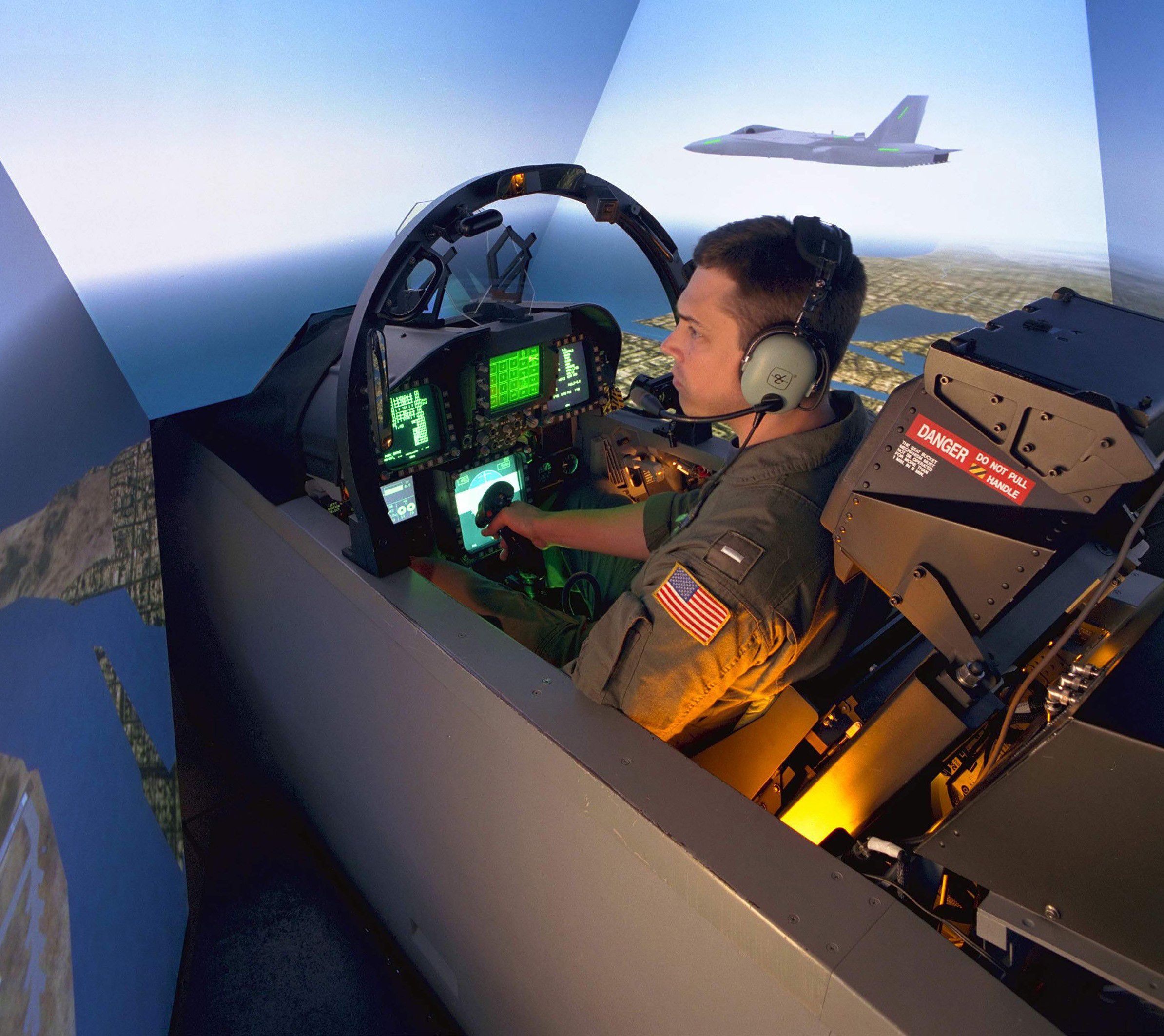
A military flight simulator

Flight simulation is mainly used to train pilots outside of the aircraft. In comparison to training in flight, simulation-based training allows for practicing maneuvers or situations that may be impractical (or even dangerous) to perform in the aircraft while keeping the pilot and instructor in a relatively low-risk environment on the ground. For example, electrical system failures, instrument failures, hydraulic system failures, and even flight control failures can be simulated without risk to the crew or equipment.

Instructors can also provide students with a higher concentration of training tasks in a given period of time than is usually possible in the aircraft. For example, conducting multiple instrument approaches in the actual aircraft may require significant time spent repositioning the aircraft, while in a simulation, as soon as one approach has been completed, the instructor can immediately reposition the simulated aircraft to a location from which the next approach can be begun.

Flight simulation also provides an economic advantage over training in an actual aircraft. Once fuel, maintenance, and insurance costs are taken into account, the operating costs of an FSTD are usually substantially lower than the operating costs of the simulated aircraft. For some large transport category airplanes, the operating costs may be several times lower for the FSTD than the actual aircraft. Another advantage is reduced environmental impact, as simulators don't contribute directly to carbon or noise emissions.

There also exist "engineering flight simulators" which are a key element of the aircraft design process. Many benefits that come from a lower number of test flights like cost and safety improvements are described above, but there are some unique advantages. Having a simulator available allows for faster design iteration cycle or using more test equipment than could be fit into a real aircraft.

=== Marine ===
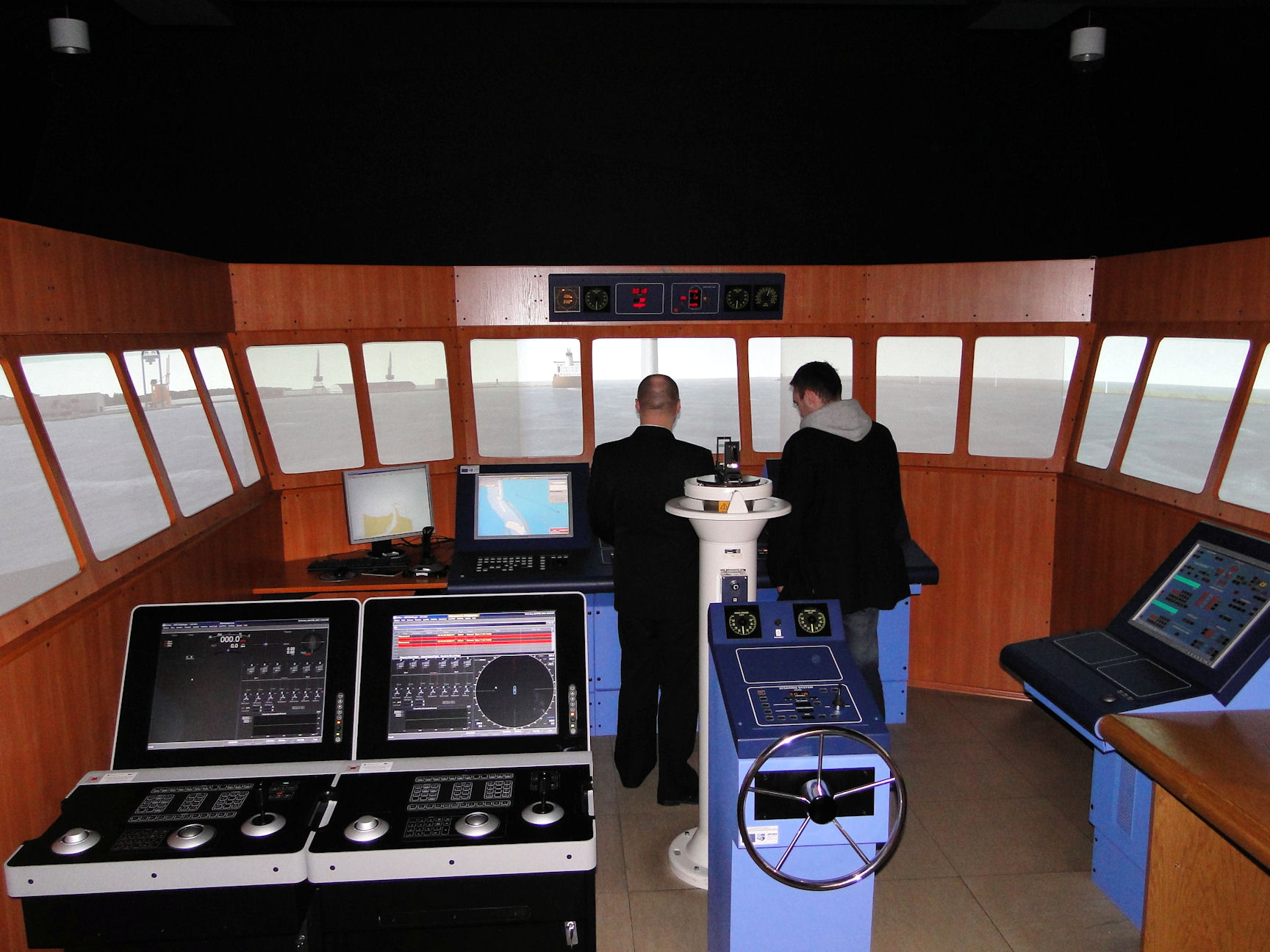
A ship bridge simulator

Bearing resemblance to flight simulators, a marine simulator is meant for training of ship personnel. The most common marine simulators include:

- Ship's bridge simulators
- Engine room simulators
- Cargo handling simulators
- Communication / GMDSS simulators
- ROV simulators

Simulators like these are mostly used within maritime colleges, training institutions, and navies. They often consist of a replication of a ships' bridge, with the operating console(s), and a number of screens on which the virtual surroundings are projected.

=== Military ===
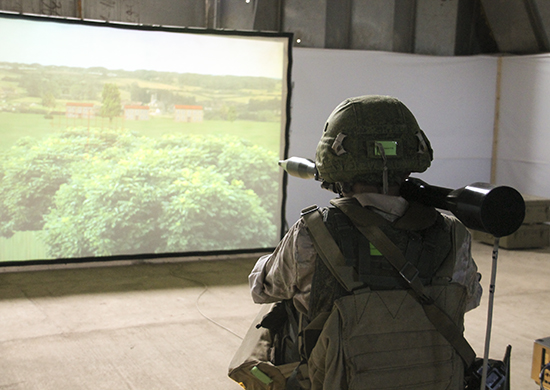
The grenade launcher trains using a computer simulator.

Military simulations, also known informally as war games, are models in which theories of warfare can be tested and refined without the need for actual hostilities. They exist in many different forms, with varying degrees of realism. In recent times, their scope has widened to include not only military but also political and social factors (for example, the Nationlab series of strategic exercises in Latin America). While many governments make use of simulation, both individually and collaboratively, little is known about the model's specifics outside professional circles.

=== Network and distributed systems ===
Network and distributed systems have been extensively simulated in other to understand the impact of new protocols and algorithms before their deployment in the actual systems. The simulation can focus on different levels (physical layer, network layer, application layer), and evaluate different metrics (network bandwidth, resource consumption, service time, dropped packets, system availability). Examples of simulation scenarios of network and distributed systems are:

- Content delivery networks
- Smart cities
- Internet of things

=== Payment and securities settlement system ===
Simulation techniques have also been applied to payment and securities settlement systems. Among the main users are central banks, which are generally responsible for the oversight of market infrastructure and are entitled to contribute to the smooth functioning of payment systems.

Central banks have been using payment system simulations to evaluate things such as the adequacy or sufficiency of liquidity available ( in the form of account balances and intraday credit limits) to participants (mainly banks) to allow efficient settlement of payments. The need for liquidity is also dependent on the availability and the type of netting procedures in the systems, thus some of the studies have a focus on system comparisons.

Another application is to evaluate risks related to events such as communication network breakdowns or the inability of participants to send payments (e.g. in case of possible bank failure). This kind of analysis falls under the concepts of stress testing or scenario analysis.

A common way to conduct these simulations is to replicate the settlement logics of the real payment or securities settlement systems under analysis and then use real observed payment data. In case of system comparison or system development, naturally, also the other settlement logics need to be implemented.

To perform stress testing and scenario analysis, the observed data needs to be altered, e.g. some payments delayed or removed. To analyze the levels of liquidity, initial liquidity levels are varied. System comparisons (benchmarking) or evaluations of new netting algorithms or rules are performed by running simulations with a fixed set of data and varying only the system setups.

An inference is usually done by comparing the benchmark simulation results to the results of altered simulation setups by comparing indicators such as unsettled transactions or settlement delays.

== Power systems ==
=== Project management ===
Project management simulation is simulation used for project management training and analysis. It is often used as a training simulation for project managers. In other cases, it is used for what-if analysis and for supporting decision-making in real projects. Frequently the simulation is conducted using software tools.

=== Robotics ===
A robotics simulator is used to create embedded applications for a specific (or not) robot without being dependent on the 'real' robot. In some cases, these applications can be transferred to the real robot (or rebuilt) without modifications. Robotics simulators allow reproducing situations that cannot be 'created' in the real world because of cost, time, or the 'uniqueness' of a resource. A simulator also allows fast robot prototyping. Many robot simulators feature physics engines to simulate a robot's dynamics.

=== Production ===
Simulation of production systems is used mainly to examine the effect of improvements or investments in a production system. Most often this is done using a static spreadsheet with process times and transportation times. For more sophisticated simulations Discrete Event Simulation (DES) is used with the advantages to simulate dynamics in the production system. A production system is very much dynamic depending on variations in manufacturing processes, assembly times, machine set-ups, breaks, breakdowns and small stoppages. There is much software commonly used for discrete event simulation. They differ in usability and markets but do often share the same foundation.

=== Sales process ===
Simulations are useful in modeling the flow of transactions through business processes, such as in the field of sales process engineering, to study and improve the flow of customer orders through various stages of completion (say, from an initial proposal for providing goods/services through order acceptance and installation). Such simulations can help predict the impact of how improvements in methods might impact variability, cost, labor time, and the number of transactions at various stages in the process. A full-featured computerized process simulator can be used to depict such models, as can simpler educational demonstrations using spreadsheet software, pennies being transferred between cups based on the roll of a die, or dipping into a tub of colored beads with a scoop.

=== Sports ===
In sports, computer simulations are often done to predict the outcome of events and the performance of individual sportspeople. They attempt to recreate the event through models built from statistics. The increase in technology has allowed anyone with knowledge of programming the ability to run simulations of their models. The simulations are built from a series of mathematical algorithms, or models, and can vary with accuracy. Accuscore, which is licensed by companies such as ESPN, is a well-known simulation program for all major sports. It offers a detailed analysis of games through simulated betting lines, projected point totals and overall probabilities.

With the increased interest in fantasy sports simulation models that predict individual player performance have gained popularity. Companies like What If Sports and StatFox specialize in not only using their simulations for predicting game results but how well individual players will do as well. Many people use models to determine whom to start in their fantasy leagues.

Another way simulations are helping the sports field is in the use of biomechanics. Models are derived and simulations are run from data received from sensors attached to athletes and video equipment. Sports biomechanics aided by simulation models answer questions regarding training techniques such as the effect of fatigue on throwing performance (height of throw) and biomechanical factors of the upper limbs (reactive strength index; hand contact time).

Computer simulations allow their users to take models which before were too complex to run, and give them answers.

=== Space shuttle countdown ===
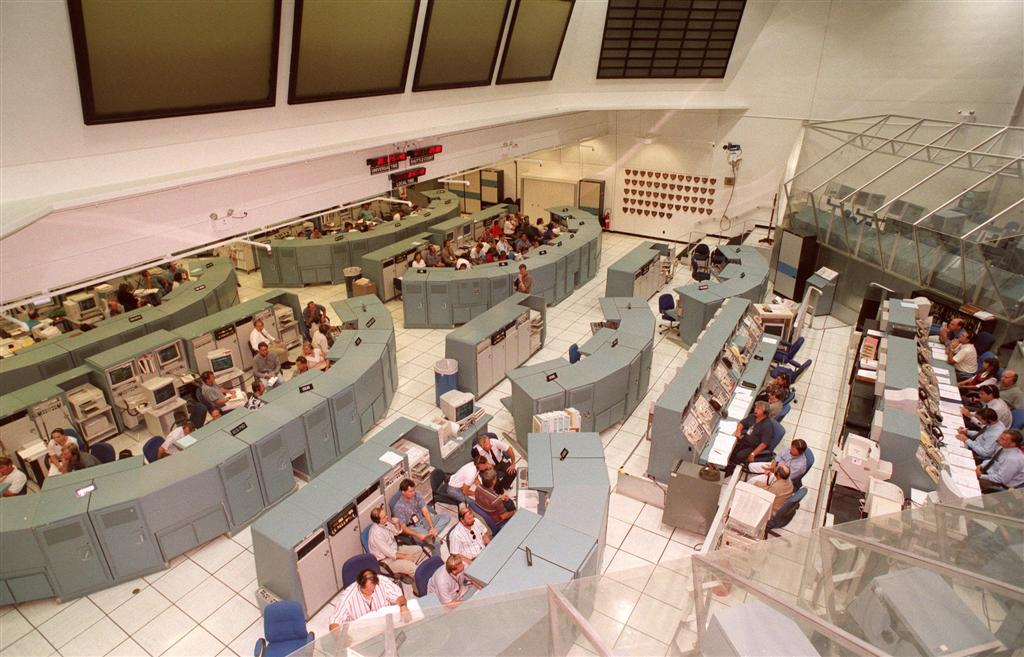
Firing Room 1 configured for Space Shuttle launches

Simulation was used at Kennedy Space Center (KSC) to train and certify Space Shuttle engineers during simulated launch countdown operations. The Space Shuttle engineering community would participate in a launch countdown integrated simulation before each Shuttle flight. This simulation is a virtual simulation where real people interact with simulated Space Shuttle vehicle and Ground Support Equipment (GSE) hardware. The Shuttle Final Countdown Phase Simulation, also known as S0044, involved countdown processes that would integrate many of the Space Shuttle vehicle and GSE systems. Some of the Shuttle systems integrated in the simulation are the main propulsion system, RS-25, solid rocket boosters, ground liquid hydrogen and liquid oxygen, external tank, flight controls, navigation, and avionics. The high-level objectives of the Shuttle Final Countdown Phase Simulation are:

- To demonstrate firing room final countdown phase operations.
- To provide training for system engineers in recognizing, reporting and evaluating system problems in a time critical environment.
- To exercise the launch team's ability to evaluate, prioritize and respond to problems in an integrated manner within a time critical environment.
- To provide procedures to be used in performing failure/recovery testing of the operations performed in the final countdown phase.

The Shuttle Final Countdown Phase Simulation took place at the Kennedy Space Center Launch Control Center firing rooms. The firing room used during the simulation is the same control room where real launch countdown operations are executed. As a result, equipment used for real launch countdown operations is engaged. Command and control computers, application software, engineering plotting and trending tools, launch countdown procedure documents, launch commit criteria documents, hardware requirement documents, and any other items used by the engineering launch countdown teams during real launch countdown operations are used during the simulation.

The Space Shuttle vehicle hardware and related GSE hardware is simulated by mathematical models (written in Shuttle Ground Operations Simulator (SGOS) modeling language) that behave and react like real hardware. During the Shuttle Final Countdown Phase Simulation, engineers command and control hardware via real application software executing in the control consoles – just as if they were commanding real vehicle hardware. However, these real software applications do not interface with real Shuttle hardware during simulations. Instead, the applications interface with mathematical model representations of the vehicle and GSE hardware. Consequently, the simulations bypass sensitive and even dangerous mechanisms while providing engineering measurements detailing how the hardware would have reacted. Since these math models interact with the command and control application software, models and simulations are also used to debug and verify the functionality of application software.

=== Satellite navigation ===
The only true way to test GNSS receivers (commonly known as Sat-Nav's in the commercial world) is by using an RF Constellation Simulator. A receiver that may, for example, be used on an aircraft, can be tested under dynamic conditions without the need to take it on a real flight. The test conditions can be repeated exactly, and there is full control over all the test parameters. this is not possible in the 'real-world' using the actual signals. For testing receivers that will use the new Galileo (satellite navigation) there is no alternative, as the real signals do not yet exist.

=== Weather ===
Predicting weather conditions by extrapolating/interpolating previous data is one of the real use of simulation. Most of the weather forecasts use this information published by Weather bureaus. This kind of simulations helps in predicting and forewarning about extreme weather conditions like the path of an active hurricane/cyclone. Numerical weather prediction for forecasting involves complicated numeric computer models to predict weather accurately by taking many parameters into account.

== Simulation games ==
Strategy games—both traditional and modern—may be viewed as simulations of abstracted decision-making for the purpose of training military and political leaders (see History of Go for an example of such a tradition, or Kriegsspiel for a more recent example).

Many other video games are simulators of some kind. Such games can simulate various aspects of reality, from business, to government, to construction, to piloting vehicles (see above).

== Historical usage ==
Historically, the word had negative connotations:

...therefore a general custom of simulation (which is this last degree) is a vice, using either of a natural falseness or fearfulness...

— Francis Bacon, Of Simulation and Dissimulation, 1597

...for Distinction Sake, a Deceiving by Words, is commonly called a Lye, and a Deceiving by Actions, Gestures, or Behavior, is called Simulation...

— Robert South, South, 1697, p.525

However, the connection between simulation and dissembling later faded out and is now only of linguistic interest.

== See also ==
- Computer experiment – Experiment used to study computer simulation
- Grey box model – Mathematical data production model with limited structure
- In silico – Latin phrase referring to computer simulations
- List of computer simulation software
- List of discrete event simulation software
- Merger simulation – Tool for analyzing potential welfare costs and benefits of mergers between firms
- Microarchitecture simulation – Tool for modeling the design and behavior of a microprocessor
- Mining simulator – Technology used for training miners
- Monte Carlo algorithm – Type of randomized algorithm
- Network simulation – Simulating computer networks
- Pharmacokinetics simulation – Simulation method used in drug development
- Roleplay simulation – Experiential learning method
- Rule-based modeling – Approach using a set of rules that indirectly specifies a mathematical model
- Simulated reality – Concept of a false version of reality
- Simulation hypothesis – Hypothesis that reality could be a computer simulation
- Simulation language – Programming language used to describe the operation of a simulation on a computer
- Training simulation – Virtual medium through which various types of skills can be acquired
- Virtual reality – Computer-simulated experience
- Web-based simulation

=== Fields of study ===
- Computational astrophysics – Methods and computing tools developed and used in astrophysics research
- Computational chemistry – Branch of chemistry
- Computational fluid dynamics – Analysis and solving of problems that involve fluid flows
- Computational physics – Numerical simulations of physical problems via computers
- Futures studies – Study of postulating possible futures
- Molecular dynamics – Computer simulations to discover and understand chemical properties
- System identification – Statistical methods to build mathematical models of dynamical systems from measured data

=== Specific examples & literature ===
- Illustris project – Computer-simulated universes
- Planet Simulator – Machine designed to study life in the universe
- Simulacra and Simulation – 1981 book by Jean Baudrillard
- UltraHLE – 1999 Nintendo 64 emulator
