= Enterprise Dynamics =

Simulation software platform

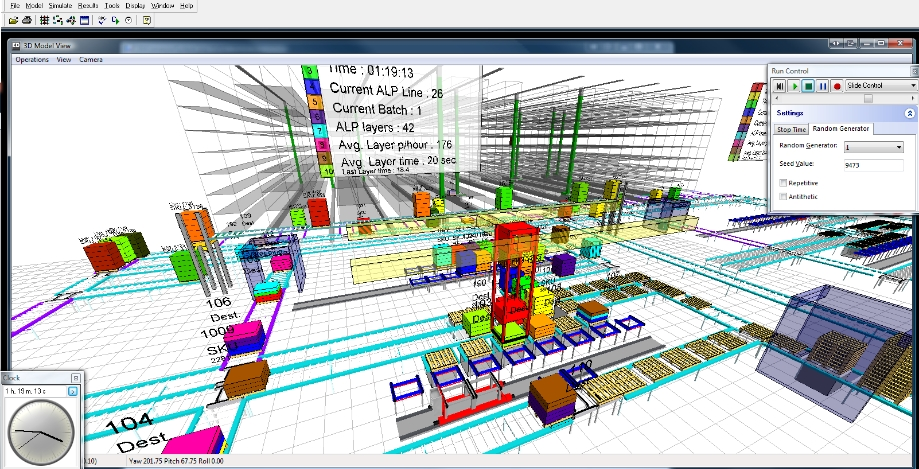
- Enterprise Dynamics, model of a warehouse
- Developer: InControl Enterprise Dynamics
- Stable release: ED 10.7,1 August 3, 2026
- Written in: Delphi 12.2, C++, 4DScript
- Operating system: Microsoft Windows
- Platform: Microsoft Windows
- Available in: English (Tutorials also in German and Dutch)
- Type: Discrete event simulation software
- License: Proprietary
- Website: www.incontrolsim.com

Enterprise Dynamics is a discrete-event simulation software platform designed to model, analyze, and optimize complex systems and processes. It is developed and maintained by InControl Enterprise Dynamics, a software company headquartered in the Netherlands. The platform is used in applications ranging from manufacturing and logistics to supply chain, transportation, and infrastructure planning.

== Overview ==
Enterprise Dynamics provides users with tools to create virtual representations of real-world systems, run simulations to explore different scenarios, and extract insights without impacting real operations. It supports both two-dimensional (2D) and three-dimensional (3D) visualization environments, allowing for detailed modeling and presentation of system behavior. The software uses an object-oriented, event-driven modeling approach in which predefined components — commonly referred to as “atoms” — are dragged and dropped into a model workspace and configured to represent real system entities and interactions.

== History ==
Enterprise Dynamics traces its origins to the Taylor II simulation software developed by F&H Simulations. In 1998, the initial simulation platform was introduced as Taylor Enterprise Dynamics. In 2000, F&H Simulations was acquired by InControl Business Engineers, and the software platform was rebranded as Enterprise Dynamics. Over time it has evolved into a comprehensive simulation environment with support for extensive modeling, visualization, and analysis features.

Since its inception, Enterprise Dynamics has undergone multiple major version releases, with enhancements in visualization, model scalability, data handling, user interface, and performance. The software continues development with periodic updates to expand functionality, improve performance, and support modern simulation requirements.

== Features ==
Enterprise Dynamics combines graphical model building with advanced simulation capabilities:

- Drag-and-Drop Modeling: Users construct simulation models by placing and connecting predefined simulation objects, enabling intuitive model creation.
- 2D and 3D Visualization: The software supports both 2D layouts and immersive 3D environments for analyzing and communicating system behavior.
- Extensive Object Libraries: Ready-to-use simulation objects (atoms) cover a range of industry domains, with support for customization and extension.
- Data Integration: Enterprise Dynamics can integrate with external data sources and systems, such as enterprise resource planning (ERP) or warehouse management systems (WMS), to enable data-driven modeling.
- Scenario Analysis: Users can construct and compare multiple scenarios to test alternative strategies or system configurations.
- Parameterization and Result Export: The platform enables detailed configuration of simulation parameters and supports exporting results for further analysis.

== Fields of application ==
Enterprise Dynamics has been applied or is currently being applied in the following fields:

- Material handling
- Supply chain management
- Logistics and distribution
- Manufacturing and production
- Metropolitan development, including rail, harbors, and airports
- Healthcare
- Automotive
- Electronics
- Contact centers
- Sports and events
- Public service
- Education

== Architecture ==
Enterprise Dynamics is an object-oriented simulation platform combined with an event-oriented approach. The user can select standard simulation objects (the so-called 'Atoms'), in which the behavior of their real life equivalents is captured, from a library and create a model by clicking and dragging the objects into the model space. For each simulation object, parameters can be altered to change its behavior.

== Editions & Licensing ==
The Enterprise Dynamics platform is available under several licensing options, including basic viewing, runtime simulation, and developer editions with full modeling capabilities. A home or educational edition is also offered for academic and personal use.

== Version history ==
Version	Release date	Major changes
1.0	1997	
2.0	1998	
2.3	November 1999	
3.0	June 2000	
3.2		
3.3		
3.4	June 2001	
4.0	December 2001	
5.0		
6.0	October 2003	Improved GUI Builder; Improved 4DScript functionality; Renewed Help system; Improved 2D and 3D visualization
6.1	January 2004	Small updates for Atoms, Visualization and Help system
6.2	March 2004	High-speed timer functionality; Optimization of 4DScript functions; Improvement of the Help system
6.3	July 2004	Improvements of several Atoms; Improvements of function 'RegisterFunction'; Improvement of the speed with which ED is capable of dealing with 'Labels'
7.0	April 2006	Further improvements of visualization and engine; Improvements of 4DScript functionality (ADO and XML); Addition of a Scenario Manager
7.1	September 2006	Improved search functionality; Addition of sensor functionality to the Advanced Conveyor Atoms
7.2	December 2007	Addition of a set of Result atoms; Major visualization issues (related to black objects in 2D view and missing buttons due to high screen resolutions) were solved; New GUIs (according to a standardized design); Revision and extension of the Example Models
8.0	April 2009	* Addition of the Advanced Automated Storage/Retrieval System (ASRS): 3D Modeling functionality
8.1	May 2010	3D visualization of the Result Atoms; Support for anaglyphs in 3D view; Addition of new 'Advanced Linear Robot' and new 'Advanced Scara Robot'
8.2	May 2011	Extension of 3D Modeling functionality; Drawing polygons in 2D; Extension of the GUI Builder
8.2.5	March 2012	Minor update containing 50 bug fixes
9.0	April 2014	Updated user interface; Packages; Graphs; Visualization; CAD Support; CityGML; SAP; ArcGIS; Human Resources; Other atoms; New Help System
10.0	May 2016	64 Bits version; Improved performance; Improved developer support; Introduction of dbExpress
10.1	April 2017	Improvements in OPC Support; Improvements in SAP Support
10.2	July 2018	Extension of 3D Modeling functionality; New VR visualization features; New Software Development Kit (SDK)
10.2.1	February 2019	Improved search functionality; Mersenne twister
10.3	February 2020	Minor update containing bug fixes
10.4		Increased reading and writing speed of the Excel ActiveX; Increased performance of table and data handling; Cut-off time of assembler now possible for containers; Initialize atom now has an “on load model” functionality; User Event atom now can be labelled or provided with a name
10.4.1	June 2021	Improved search options; Label overview expanded; Improved user-experience
10.5	September 2022	Updated visualization components for Windows 11; Upgraded and improved 3D support files; Sleep modus; Updated Exit Screen; Settings for Screen configuration
10.5.1	September 2023	Function Editor Atom; Product table availability; Enhanced user event code handling; Node Atom Improvements
10.6	September 2023	Function Editor Atom; Product table availability; Enhanced user event code handling; Node Atom Improvements
10.6.1	December 2024	Starting Debugger on Code; Customizable Channel Size; Autosaving and Auto-loading the Interact
10.7	December 2025	Student-T Distribution added; Updated AutoCAD importer + ACAD 2025 file support; Engine upgrades for more efficient memory management
10.7.1	August 2026	License Manager Improvements; Improved tools for model developers; Stability improvements

== Add-ons ==
Add-ons are available to extend the functionality of ED:

- CAD Import Wizard
- DLL Kit
- Emulation - OPC
- Security Kit
- OptQuest

== Packages ==
- Advanced Robots This package contains a set of 3 commonly used robots, namely a Linear, SCARA and a vertical articulated robot which can be used for more detailed simulations.
- ASRS This package adds an Automated Storage and Retrieval System- or ASRS-atom to the installation of Enterprise Dynamics.
- Transfer Car This package contains a Transfer Car atom (Transport) and 2 example models (a pull and a push model). A Transfer Car system is a rail bound single or double track vehicle for fast and reasonable linear transport and/or to combine multiple input and output locations of material flow.
- Developer Tools With the developer Tools the option is given to more advanced users to also create their own packages, which simplifies the roll-out of libraries to end-users.
- OPC-client The OPC browser allows access to OPC-servers (v1.0, v2.0 and v3.0) and is a tool that makes it possible to easily browse and configure OPC services. Browsing OPC services is useful for seeing what is going on, however its main purpose in Enterprise Dynamics is to help setting up complex configurations.
- SDK The Software Development Kit is containing several advanced tools like a profiler (analyze the performance of a model), the DLL-kit (connect Enterprise Dynamics to a dll), ActiveX (connect Enterprise Dynamics to for instance Access, C#, Delphi, Excel of VB), connect a model using sockets or create an automated help documentation via Doxygen.
