= Care Pathway Simulator =

Discrete event simulation software program

- Developer: NHS (used within NHS projects)
- Operating system: Microsoft Windows
- Type: Discrete event simulation, Healthcare modeling
- License: Proprietary

Care Pathway Simulator is a discrete event simulation software program that has been used to design and test healthcare processes in the NHS. The method used by CPS is to view the system from the perspective of the task, job or patient rather than the function. It is a Windows application and uses a graphical user interface to create the models.
