= Simulation language =

Programming language used to describe the operation of a simulation on a computer

A computer simulation language is used to describe the operation of a simulation on a computer. There are two major types of simulation: continuous and discrete event though more modern languages can handle more complex combinations. Most languages also have a graphical interface and at least a simple statistic gathering capability for the analysis of the results. An important part of discrete-event languages is the ability to generate pseudo-random numbers and variants from different probability distributions.

== See also ==
- Discrete event simulation – Type of simulation
- List of computer simulation software
- List of HDL simulators: simulators whose model is specified using a hardware description language
- Simulation – Imitation of the operation of a real-world process or system over time
