= JaamSim =

Software for discrete event simulation

- Developer: JaamSim Software Inc.
- Initial release: September 2011; 14 years ago
- Stable release: 2026-01 / February 24, 2026; 0 days ago
- Written in: Java
- Operating system: Windows, Linux, macOS
- Platform: Java
- License: Apache 2.0
- Website: jaamsim.com
- Repository: github.com/jaamsim/jaamsim

JaamSim is a fast and scalable discrete-event simulation software that includes a drag-and-drop user interface, interactive 3D graphics, input and output processing and model development tools and editors.

"Out of all the OS DES projects we reviewed, JaamSim is the one with the most impressive 3D user interface that can compete against COTS DES software. [...] The fact that a non-expert user can just download and test the software in a few minutes is something that is a scarce attribute in OS projects and especially in the DES domain. [...] It is the only tool we found that is clearly industry driven [...] and this may have led to more consistent motivation and funding."

"JaamSim provides everything which is necessary to model typical planning tasks in production and logistics and proves as a real alternative to commercial DES tools."

JaamSim is free open-source software.

== Features ==
- Drag-and-drop model building
- Animated 3D graphics
- Submodels
- Libraries of model objects
- Units for all relevant inputs, outputs, and expressions
- Version control of model inputs using standard software such as Git
