= Discrete-event simulation =

Type of simulation

A discrete-event simulation (DES) models the operation of a system as a (discrete) sequence of events in time. Each event occurs at a particular instant in time and marks a change of state in the system. Between consecutive events, no change in the system is assumed to occur; thus the simulation time can directly jump to the occurrence time of the next event, which is called next-event time progression.

In addition to next-event time progression, there is also an alternative approach, called incremental time progression, where time is broken up into small time slices and the system state is updated according to the set of events/activities happening in the time slice. Because not every time slice has to be simulated, a next-event time simulation can typically run faster than a corresponding incremental time simulation.

Both forms of DES contrast with continuous simulation in which the system state is changed continuously over time on the basis of a set of differential equations defining the rates of change for state variables.

In the past, these three types of simulation have also been referred to, respectively, as: event scheduling simulation, activity scanning simulation, and process interaction simulation. It can also be noted that there are similarities between the implementation of the event queue in event scheduling, and the scheduling queue used in operating systems.

== Example ==
A common exercise in learning how to build discrete-event simulations is to model a queueing system, such as customers arriving at a bank teller to be served by a clerk. In this example, the system objects are customer and teller, while the system events are customer-arrival, service-start and service-end. Each of these events comes with its own dynamics defined by the following event routines:

1. When a customer-arrival event occurs, the state variable queue-length is incremented by 1, and if the state variable teller-status has the value "available", a service-start follow-up event is scheduled to happen without any delay, such that the newly arrived customer will be served immediately.
2. When a service-start event occurs, the state variable teller-status is set to "busy" and a service-end follow-up event is scheduled with a delay (obtained from sampling a service-time random variable).
3. When a service-end event occurs, the state variable queue-length is decremented by 1 (representing the customer's departure). If the state variable queue-length is still greater than zero, a Service-Start follow-up event is scheduled to happen without any delay. Otherwise, the state variable teller-status is set to "available".

The random variables that need to be characterized to model this system stochastically are the interarrival-time for recurrent customer-arrival events and the service-time for the delays of service-end events.

== Components ==
=== State ===
A system state is a set of variables that captures the salient properties of the system to be studied. The state trajectory over time S(t) can be mathematically represented by a step function whose value can change whenever an event occurs.

=== Clock ===
The simulation must keep track of the current simulation time, in whatever measurement units are suitable for the system being modeled. In discrete-event simulations, as opposed to continuous simulations, time 'hops' because events are instantaneous – the clock skips to the next event start time as the simulation proceeds.

=== Events list ===
The simulation maintains at least one list of simulation events. This is sometimes called the pending event set because it lists events that are pending as a result of previously simulated event but have yet to be simulated themselves. An event is described by the time at which it occurs and a type, indicating the code that will be used to simulate that event. It is common for the event code to be parametrized, in which case, the event description also contains parameters to the event code. The event list is also referred to as the future event list (FEL) or future event set (FES).

When events are instantaneous, activities that extend over time are modeled as sequences of events. Some simulation frameworks allow the time of an event to be specified as an interval, giving the start time and the end time of each event.

Single-threaded simulation engines based on instantaneous events have just one current event. In contrast, multi-threaded simulation engines and simulation engines supporting an interval-based event model may have multiple current events. In both cases, there are significant problems with synchronization between current events.

The pending event set is typically organized as a priority queue, sorted by event time. That is, regardless of the order in which events are added to the event set, they are removed in strictly chronological order. Various priority queue implementations have been studied in the context of discrete event simulation; alternatives studied have included splay trees, skip lists, calendar queues, and ladder queues. On massively-parallel machines, such as multi-core or many-core CPUs, the pending event set can be implemented by relying on non-blocking algorithms, in order to reduce the cost of synchronization among the concurrent threads.

Typically, events are scheduled dynamically as the simulation proceeds. For example, in the bank example noted above, the event CUSTOMER-ARRIVAL at time t would, if the CUSTOMER_QUEUE was empty and TELLER was idle, include the creation of the subsequent event CUSTOMER-DEPARTURE to occur at time t+s, where s is a number generated from the SERVICE-TIME distribution.

=== Random-number generators ===
The simulation needs to generate random variables of various kinds, depending on the system model. This is accomplished by one or more Pseudorandom number generators. The use of pseudo-random numbers as opposed to true random numbers is a benefit should a simulation need a rerun with exactly the same behavior.

One of the problems with the random number distributions used in discrete-event simulation is that the steady-state distributions of event times may not be known in advance. As a result, the initial set of events placed into the pending event set will not have arrival times representative of the steady-state distribution. This problem is typically solved by bootstrapping the simulation model. Only a limited effort is made to assign realistic times to the initial set of pending events. These events, however, schedule additional events, and with time, the distribution of event times approaches its steady state. This is called bootstrapping the simulation model. In gathering statistics from the running model, it is important to either disregard events that occur before the steady state is reached or to run the simulation for long enough that the bootstrapping behavior is overwhelmed by steady-state behavior. (This use of the term bootstrapping can be contrasted with its use in both statistics and computing).

=== Statistics ===
The simulation typically keeps track of the system's statistics, which quantify the aspects of interest. In the bank example, it is of interest to track the mean waiting times. In a simulation model, performance metrics are not analytically derived from probability distributions, but rather as averages over replications, that is different runs of the model. Confidence intervals are usually constructed to help assess the quality of the output.

=== Ending condition ===
Because events are bootstrapped, theoretically a discrete-event simulation could run forever. So the simulation designer must decide when the simulation will end. Typical choices are "at time t" or "after processing n number of events" or, more generally, "when statistical measure X reaches the value x".

=== Three-phased approach ===
Pidd (1998) has proposed the three-phased approach to discrete event simulation. In this approach, the first phase is to jump to the next chronological event. The second phase is to execute all events that unconditionally occur at that time (these are called B-events). The third phase is to execute all events that conditionally occur at that time (these are called C-events). The three phase approach is a refinement of the event-based approach in which simultaneous events are ordered so as to make the most efficient use of computer resources. The three-phase approach is used by a number of commercial simulation software packages, but from the user's point of view, the specifics of the underlying simulation method are generally hidden.

== Common uses ==
=== Diagnosing process issues ===
Simulation approaches are particularly well equipped to help users diagnose issues in complex environments. The theory of constraints illustrates the importance of understanding bottlenecks in a system. Identifying and removing bottlenecks allows improving processes and the overall system. For instance, in manufacturing enterprises bottlenecks may be created by excess inventory, overproduction, variability in processes and variability in routing or sequencing. By accurately documenting the system with the help of a simulation model it is possible to gain a bird’s eye view of the entire system.

A working model of a system allows management to understand performance drivers. A simulation can be built to include any number of performance indicators such as worker utilization, on-time delivery rate, scrap rate, cash cycles, and so on.

=== Hospital applications ===
An operating theater is generally shared between several surgical disciplines. Through better understanding the nature of these procedures it may be possible to increase the patient throughput. Example: If a heart surgery takes on average four hours, changing an operating room schedule from eight available hours to nine will not increase patient throughput. On the other hand, if a hernia procedure takes on average twenty minutes providing an extra hour may also not yield any increased throughput if the capacity and average time spent in the recovery room is not considered.

=== Lab test performance improvement ideas ===
Many systems improvement ideas are built on sound principles, proven methodologies (Lean, Six Sigma, TQM, etc.) yet fail to improve the overall system. A simulation model allows the user to understand and test a performance improvement idea in the context of the overall system.

=== Evaluating capital investment decisions ===
Simulation modeling is commonly used to model potential investments. Through modeling investments decision-makers can make informed decisions and evaluate potential alternatives.

=== Network simulators ===
Discrete event simulation is used in computer network to simulate new protocols, different system architectures (distributed, hierarchical, centralised, P2P) before actual deployment. It is possible to define different evaluation metrics, such as service time, bandwidth, dropped packets, resource consumption, and so on.

== See also ==
System modeling approaches:

- Finite-state machines and Markov chains
- Stochastic process and a special case, Markov process
- Queueing theory and in particular birth–death process
- Discrete event system specification
- Discrete rate simulation
- Transaction-level modeling (TLM)

Computational techniques:

- Computer experiment
- Computer simulation
- Monte Carlo method
- Variance reduction
- Pseudo-random number generator

Software:

- List of computer simulation software
- List of discrete event simulation software

Disciplines:

- Industrial engineering
- Network simulation
