= List of computer simulation software =

The following is a list of notable computer simulation software.

== Free or open-source ==
- Advanced Simulation Library - open-source hardware accelerated multiphysics simulation software.
- ASCEND - open-source equation-based modelling environment.
- Blender – 3D creation suite with support for modeling, animation, simulation, and rendering.
- Cantera - chemical kinetics package.
- Celestia - a 3D astronomy program.
- CP2K - Open-source ab-initio molecular dynamics program.
- DWSIM - an open-source CAPE-OPEN compliant chemical process simulator.
- EFDC Explorer - open-source for processing of the Environmental Fluid Dynamics Code (EFDC).
- Elmer - an open-source multiphysical simulation software for Windows/Mac/Linux.
- FlightGear - a free, open-source atmospheric and orbital flight simulator with a flight dynamics engine (JSBSim) that is used in a 2015 NASA benchmark to judge new simulation code to space industry standards.
- FreeFem++ - Free, open-source, multiphysics Finite Element Analysis (FEA) software.
- Freemat - a free environment for rapid engineering, scientific prototyping and data processing using the same language as MATLAB and GNU Octave.
- Gekko - simulation software in Python with machine learning and optimization
- GNU Octave - an open-source mathematical modeling and simulation software very similar to using the same language as MATLAB and Freemat.
- JaamSim is an open-source Java-based discrete-event simulation environment.
- JModelica.org is a free and open source software platform based on the Modelica modeling language.
- Meep - an open source package for electromagnetic simulation with finite-difference time-domain (FDTD) method
- Mobility Testbed - an open-source multi-agent simulation testbed for transport coordination algorithms.
- MPB - an open source package for electromagnetic band diagram analysis of periodic structures such as photonic crystals
- MuJoCo - short for Multi-Joint dynamics with Contact, is a general purpose physics engine that is tailored to scientific use cases such as robotics, biomechanics and machine learning.
- NEST - open-source software for spiking neural network models.
- NetLogo - an open-source multi-agent simulation software.
- ns-3 - an open-source network simulator.
- OpenFOAM - open-source software used for computational fluid dynamics (or CFD).
- OpenModelica - an open source modeling environment based on Modelica the open standard for modeling software.
- Open Source Physics - an open-source Java software project for teaching and studying physics.
- OpenSim - an open-source software system for biomechanical modeling.
- preCICE (software) - an open-source library for partitioned multi-physics simulations.
- Project Chrono - an open-source multi-physics simulation framework.
- Repast - agent-based modeling and simulation platform with versions for individual workstations and high performance computer clusters.
- SageMath - a system for algebra and geometry experimentation via Python.
- Scilab - free open-source software for numerical computation and simulation similar to MATLAB/Simulink.
- Sim4Life.lite - online version of Sim4Life that is free-of-charge for students for team-learning and online collaboration with classmates and teachers on limited size projects.
- Simantics System Dynamics – used for modelling and simulating large hierarchical models with multidimensional variables created in a traditional way with stock and flow diagrams and causal loop diagrams.
- SimPy - an open-source discrete-event simulation package based on Python.
- Simulation of Urban MObility - an open-source traffic simulation package.
- SOFA - an open-source framework for multi-physics simulation with an emphasis on medical simulation.
- SU2 code - an open-source framework for computational fluid dynamics simulation and optimal shape design.
- Step - an open-source two-dimensional physics simulation engine (KDE).
- StochSD - Stochastic and deterministic modelling and simulation based on the System Dynamics approach to Continuous System Simulation (CSS).
- Tortuga - an open-source software framework for discrete-event simulation in Java.
- UrbanSim – an open-source software to simulate land use, transportation and environmental planning.

== Proprietary ==
- Adaptive Simulations - cloud based and fully automated CFD simulations.
- Akselos - reduced-basis finite element-based simulation software for structural and thermal analyses.
- AGX Dynamics - realtime oriented multibody and multiphysics simulation engine.
- 20-sim - bond graph-based multi-domain simulation software.
- Actran - finite element-based simulation software to analyze the acoustic behavior of mechanical systems and parts.
- ADINA - engineering simulation software for structural, fluid, heat transfer, and multiphysics problems.
- ACSL and acslX - an advanced continuous simulation language.
- Algodoo - 2D physics simulator focused on the education market that is popular with younger users.
- Simcenter Amesim - a platform to analyze multi-domain, intelligent systems and predict and optimize multi-disciplinary performance. Developed by Siemens Digital Industries Software.
- ANSYS - engineering simulation.
- AnyLogic - a multi-method simulation modeling tool for business and science. Developed by The AnyLogic Company.
- APMonitor - a tool for dynamic simulation, validation, and optimization of multi-domain systems with interfaces to Python and MATLAB.
- Arena - a flowchart-based discrete event simulation software developed by Rockwell Automation
- Automation Studio - a fluid power, electrical and control systems design and simulation software developed by Famic Technologies Inc.
- Chemical WorkBench - a chemical kinetics simulation software tool developed by Kintech Lab.
- CircuitLogix - an electronics simulation software developed by Logic Design Inc.
- COMSOL Multiphysics - a predominantly finite element analysis, solver and simulation software package for various physics and engineering applications, especially coupled phenomena, or multi-physics.
- CONSELF - browser based CFD and FEA simulation platform.
- DX Studio - a suite of tools for simulation and visualization.
- Dymola - modeling and simulation software based on the Modelica language.
- DYNAMO - historically important language used for system dynamics modelling.
- Ecolego - a simulation software tool for creating dynamic models and performing deterministic and probabilistic simulations.
- EcosimPro - continuous and discrete modelling and simulation software.
- Enterprise Architect - a tool for simulation of UML behavioral modeling, coupled with Win32 user interface interaction.
- Enterprise Dynamics - a simulation software platform developed by INCONTROL Simulation Solutions.
- ExtendSim - simulation software for discrete event, continuous, discrete rate and agent-based simulation.
- FEATool Multiphysics - finite element physics and PDE simulation toolbox for MATLAB.
- Flexsim - discrete event simulation software.
- Flood Modeller - hydraulic simulation software, used to model potential flooding risk for engineering purposes.
- GoldSim - simulation software for system dynamics and discrete event simulation, embedded in a Monte Carlo framework.
- HyperWorks - multi-discipline simulation software
- IDA ICE - equation-based (DAE) software for building performance simulation
- Isaac dynamics - dynamic process simulation software for conventional and renewable power plants.
- iThink - system dynamics and discrete event modeling software for business strategy, public policy, and education. Developed by isee systems.
- JMAG - simulation software for electric device design and development.
- Khimera - a chemical kinetics simulation software tool developed by Kintech Lab.
- Lanner WITNESS - a discrete event simulation platform for modelling processes and experimentation.
- Lanner L-SIM Server - Java-based simulation engine for simulating BPMN2.0 based process models.
- MADYMO – automotive and transport safety software developed by Netherlands Organization for Applied Scientific Research
- Maple - a general-purpose computer algebra system developed and sold commercially by Waterloo Maple Inc.
- MapleSim - a multi-domain modeling and simulation tool developed by Waterloo Maple Inc.
- MATLAB - a programming, modeling and simulation tool developed by MathWorks.
- Mathematica - a computational software program based on symbolic mathematics, developed by Wolfram Research.
- Micro Saint Sharp - a general purpose discrete event software tool using a graphical flowchart approach and on the C# language, developed by Alion Science and Technology.
- ModelCenter - a framework for integration of third-party modeling and simulation tools/scripts, workflow automation, and multidisciplinary design analysis and optimization from Phoenix Integration.
- NEi Nastran - software for engineering simulation of stress, dynamics, and heat transfer in structures.
- NI Multisim - an electronic schematic capture and simulation program.
- Plant Simulation - plant, line and process simulation and optimization software, developed by Siemens Digital Industries Software.
- PLECS - a tool for system-level simulations of electrical circuits. Developed by Plexim.
- Project Team Builder - a project management simulator used for training and education.
- ProLB - a computational fluid dynamics simulation software based on the Lattice Boltzmann method.
- PTV Vissim - a microscopic and mesoscopic traffic flow simulation software.
- PSF Lab - calculates the point spread function of an optical microscope under various imaging conditions based on a rigorous vectorial model.
- RoboLogix - robotics simulation software developed by Logic Design Inc.
- Ship Simulator - a vehicle simulation computer game by VSTEP which simulates maneuvering various ships in different environments.
- Sim4Life - 3D computer-aided-design-based electromagnetic (EM) simulation platform: Sim4Life, which includes all elements of the now discontinued SEMCAD platform developed by Schmid and Partner Engineering AG, combines classical technical computer-aided-design tools with multi-physics solvers, computational human phantoms, medical-image-based modeling, and physiological tissue models.
- Simcad Pro - Process simulation software with On-The-Fly model changes while the simulation is running. Lean analysis, VR, and physics. Developed by CreateASoft, Inc. Chicago USA
- Simcenter STAR-CCM+ - a computational fluid dynamics based simulation software developed by Siemens Digital Industries Software.
- SimEvents - a part of MathWorks which adds discrete event simulation to the MATLAB/Simulink environment.
- SimScale - a web-based simulation platform, with CFD, FEA, and thermodynamics capabilities.
- SIMUL8 - software for discrete event or process based simulation.
- Simulations Plus - modeling and simulation software for pharmaceutical research
- SimulationX - modeling and simulation software based on the Modelica language.
- Simulink - a tool for block diagrams, electrical mechanical systems and machines from MathWorks.
- SRM Engine Suite - engineering tool used for simulating fuels, combustion and exhaust gas emissions in IC engine applications.
- STELLA - system dynamics and discrete event modeling software for business strategy, public policy, and education. Developed by isee systems.
- TRNSYS - software for dynamic simulation of renewable energy systems, HVAC systems, building energy use and both passive and active solar systems.
- UNIGINE - real-time 3D visualization SDK for simulation and training. Supports C++ and C# programming languages.
- Unreal Engine - immersive virtual-reality training simulation software.
- Vensim - system dynamics and continuous simulation software for business and public policy applications.
- VisSim - system simulation and optional C-code generation of electrical, process, control, bio-medical, mechanical and UML State chart systems.
- Vortex (software) - a complete simulation platform featuring a realtime physics engine for rigid body dynamics, an image generator, desktop tools (Editor and Player) and more. Also available as Vortex Studio Essentials, a limited free version.
- Wolfram SystemModeler – modeling and simulation software based on the Modelica language.
- Visual Components - a 3D factory simulation software for manufacturing applications including layout planning, production simulation, off-line programming and PLC verification.
- VisualSim Architect – an electronic system-level software for modeling and simulation of electronic systems, embedded software and semiconductors.
- VSim - a multiphysics simulation software tool designed to run computationally intensive electromagnetic, electrostatic, and plasma simulations.
- zSpace – creates physical science applications

== See also ==
- Conway's Game of Life
- List of chemical process simulators
- List of computational fluid dynamics software
- List of computer-aided engineering software
- List of discrete event simulation software
- List of finite element software packages
- List of lighting design software
- List of plasma physics software
- List of software for nanostructures modeling
- List of ray tracing software
- List of robotics simulators
- List of systems biology modeling software
- Simulation language
