= ExtendSim =

ExtendSim Simulation Software
- Original author(s): Imagine That Inc.
- Developer(s): ANDRITZ Inc.
- Stable release: 2024.R1 / July 24, 2024; 9 months ago
- Operating system: A 64-bit version of Windows, such as 11, 10, or Server 2022.
- Available in: English
- Type: Simulation & Simulation-based optimization
- License: Proprietary, Individual, Node-Locked, Floating, and Cloud licenses
- Website: www.extendsim.com

ExtendSim is a simulation program for modeling discrete event, continuous, agent-based, discrete rate, and mixed-mode processes. There are three main ExtendSim simulation model building packages: CP for modeling continuous processes; DE which adds discrete event technology; and Pro which adds discrete rate and reliability block diagramming modules.

== History ==
Year	Features added
1987	Original release for continuous modeling on the Macintosh
1989	Discrete event capabilities added
1992	Hierarchical modeling, Cloning, Animation, Interactivity
1994	Sensitivity Analysis, interface to Microsoft Excel
1995	Release for Microsoft Windows
1998	Scripting, Activity-Based Costing
2001	Optimizer, ActiveX/COM and ODBC support, source code debugger
2002	FTP support
2007	Changed product name from Extend to ExtendSim, internal database
2008	Discrete rate and 3D capabilities added
2010	Scenario Manager, Advanced Resource Manager
2013	ADO database support, Flow attributes
2018	Integrated reliability diagramming, ExtendSim Cloud released
2024	Multicore Analysis to run models in parallel and launch multiple instances of ExtendSim

== Model construction ==
Models are created by placing blocks from a library into a model worksheet. Blocks are connected together to create the logical flow of the model. Data for the model resides in the parameters of the blocks and in a proprietary database. New blocks can be created by combining existing blocks into a single hierarchical block or by programming a block in ExtendSim's C-based language, ModL. The major libraries in ExtendSim are:

Library name	Purpose	Sample blocks
Value	Mathematical calculations, remote data access, statistics collection	Math, Equation, Decision, Random Number, Read, Write, Mean & Variance
Item	Models discrete event processes	Queue, Activity, Equation, Create, Batch & Unbatch, Resource Management, Select Item In & Out
Rate	Models discrete rate processes for high-speed, high-volume simulation	Tank, Valve, Interchange, Convey Flow, Merge & Diverge, Throw & Catch Flow
Reliability	Reliability block diagramming	Start Node, Component, End Node, Event Builder, Distribution Builder
Chart	Displays plots and charts	Bar, Scatter, Histogram, Line, and Database Line, Database Statistics
Report	Reporting model results	Reports Manager, Cost Stats, Item Log Manager
Analysis	Organizing and optimizing model data and results, plus launching multiple instances of ExtendSim	Analysis Manager, Multicore Analysis, Optimizer, Scenario Manager
Utilities	Model interface, debugging, and information	Buttons, Record Message, Memory Usage

== Application areas ==
Sample applications include resource optimization for food logistics, six sigma process improvement for a hospital emergency department, communication systems, and manufacturing facility design

== See also ==
- Simulation software
- Modeling and simulation
- Computer simulation
- Discrete event simulation
- Discrete rate simulation
- Continuous simulation
- Reliability block diagram
- Process optimization
- Simulation in manufacturing systems
- Medical simulation
- Project management simulation
- Traffic simulation
- Military simulation
- Network simulation
- List of discrete event simulation software
