= Swiss Innovation Park =

National network of science parks

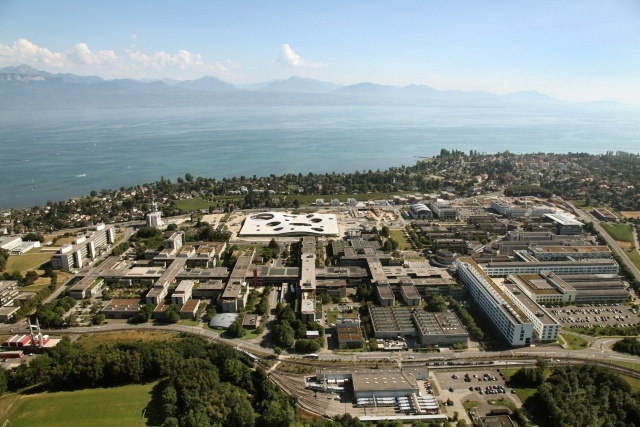
One branch of the Swiss Innovation Park is located on the campus of the École polytechnique fédérale de Lausanne, at the shores of Lake Geneva.

Switzerland Innovation (German: Schweizerischer Innovationspark; French: Parc suisse d'innovation), organised through the Switzerland Innovation Foundation is the Swiss national network of science parks.

It was inaugurated by Johann Schneider-Ammann on 18 January 2016 and will be organised around five locations:

- Swiss Innovation Park Basel Area (in Allschwil);
- Swiss Innovation Park innovaare (near the Paul Scherrer Institute in Villigen);
- Swiss Innovation Park Zurich (on areas of the Dübendorf Air Base);
- Swiss Innovation Park Biel/Bienne;
- Switzerland Innovation Park Network West EPFL ("Romandy hub"):
  - EPFL Innovation Park
  - Biopôle in Épalinges;
  - Microcity in Neuchâtel;
  - Energypolis in Sion;
  - Bluefactory in Fribourg;
  - Campus Biotech in Geneva.

== Company involvement ==
Various companies and organisations are based at Switzerland Innovation Park locations, ranging from startups to multinational organisations.

=== Switzerland Innovation Park Network West EPFL ===
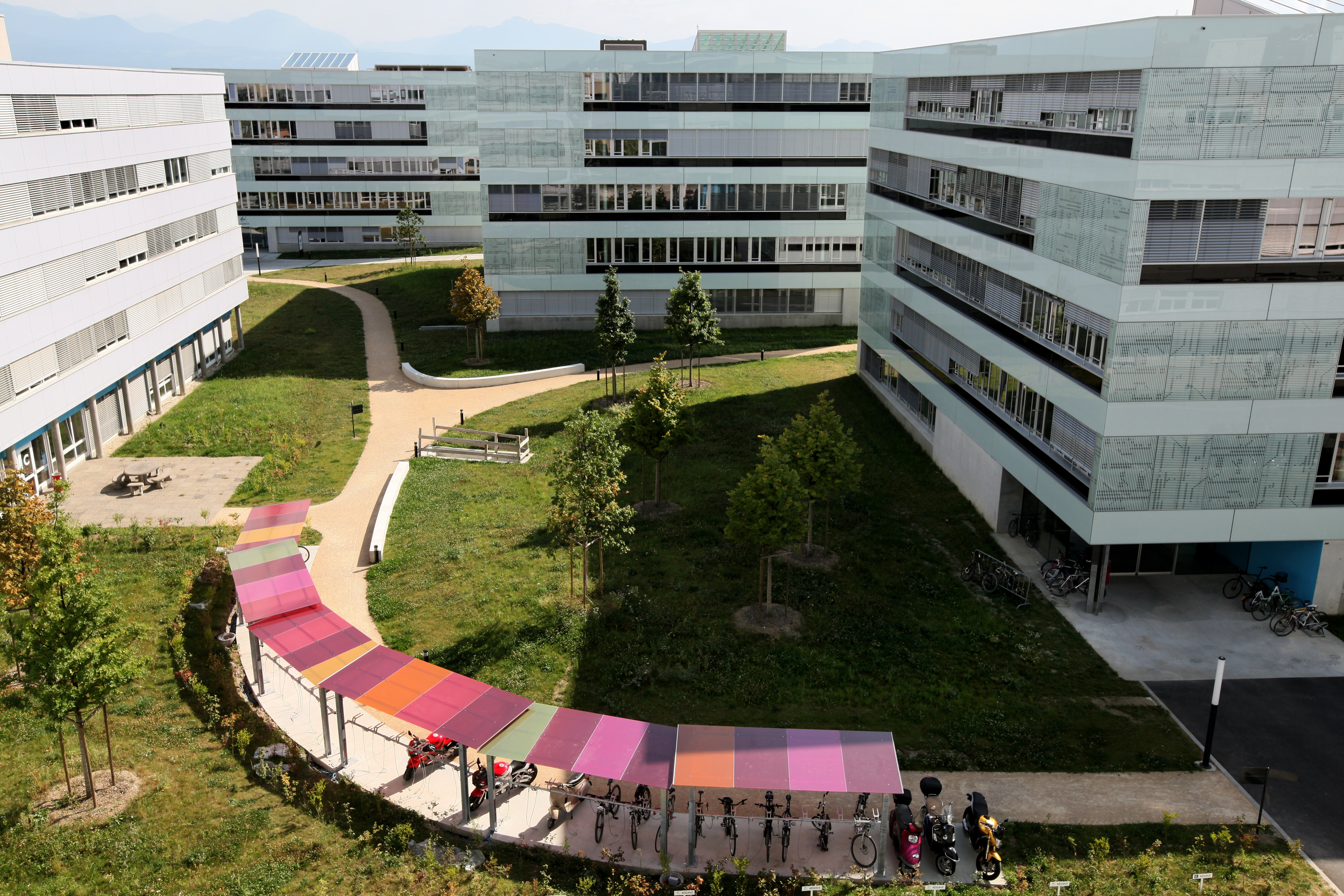
Buildings at the EPFL Innovation Park campus in Lausanne, Switzerland

Over 200 companies are listed as resident at the EPFL campuses in Lausanne and Geneva (Campus Biotech). These include:

- Akselos – simulation software
- Camptocamp SA – open source software solutions startup.
- Cisco Systems – global communications and information technology product and service provider.
- DistalMotion SA – startup developing devices for minimally-invasive surgery.
- Gamaya – hyperspectral cameras for precision agriculture
- High Lantern Group – consulting firm dealing in strategic positioning.
- Intel – multinational semiconductor chip manufacturer.
- Iprova Sàrl – a Swiss startup specialising in Computer-Accelerated Invention.
- Logitech – a Swiss manufacturer of computer peripherals and software.
- Nestlé Institute of Health Sciences – part of Nestlé's research and development section, specialising in biomedical research.
- Scantrust – software for product authentication and traceability.
- Signals Analytics – data analytics company with its own proprietary software, Signals Playbook.
- Sophia Genetics SA – Swiss medical bioinformatics startup.
- Texas Instruments ITC – semiconductor and integrated circuit manufacturer.

=== Swiss Innovation Park Zürich ===
Source: The Zürich location of the Swiss Innovation Park has had slow progress getting the necessary political green lights. Nonetheless, various ETH Competition Teams have already found their new Headquarters in the new Dübendorf location. These include:

- AMZ - The university's Academic Motorsport Association.
- ARIS - The university's Academic Spaceflight Initiative.
- Swissloop - The university's Hyperloop team.
- E-Sling - A group focusing on the electrification of a 4 seater.
- aCentauri Solar Racing - The university's solar racing team.

After its completion the Innovation Park in Zürich expects to house more commercial companies such as:

- Matternet
- VRM Switzerland
- New Green Tec
- V-Locker
- AEROPLAN
- Habasit
- VILT
- Swiss Sino Innovation Center

== See also ==
- State Secretariat for Education, Research and Innovation
