= AGX =

AGX may refer to:

== Arts and entertainment ==
- AGX-05 Cybuster, fictional mecha in the video game 2nd Super Robot Wars Original Generation
- AGX-04 Gerbera Tetra, fictional mobile suit in the anime series Mobile Suit Gundam 0083: Stardust Memory

== Businesses and organizations ==
- Aviogenex, a former Serbian airline, ICAO code AGX
- AGX Resources, former name of Pacific Rubiales Energy
- AGX, a Brazilian unmanned aerial vehicles manufacturer

== Science and technology ==
- AGX graphite, nuclear graphite
- AgX, pseudo-chemical notation for Silver halide
- Advanced Graphics eXtended, variation of PCI-based AGP port
- AGX Multiphysics, a proprietary real-time physics engine

== Other uses ==
- Renault AGx, a range of trucks
- Agatti Aerodrome, an airport in Lakshadweep, India, IATA code AGX
- Aghul language, ISO 639-3 code agx

== See also ==
- AGXT, enzyme
- AG (disambiguation)
