= OptQuest =

Optimization tool to use with simulation software

- Developer(s): OptTek Systems, Inc.
- Initial release: 1998; 27 years ago
- Type: Optimization software
- Website: www.opttek.com/products/optquest

OptQuest is an optimization software developed by OptTek Systems, Inc., used to tackle complex optimization problems through Simulation-based optimization (SBO). It primarily integrates with commercial simulation software to improve decision-making and optimization in scenarios characterized by stochastic behavior and complexity.

== Underlying algorithms ==
Like other optimization packages and SBO products, OptQuest utilizes metaheuristic algorithms. Among them, OptQuest uses:

- Tabu search
- Scatter search

OptQuest, like practically all software packages for simulation-based optimization, utilizes iterative heuristics and approaches the simulation model as a black box, meaning it only interacts with the model through its input and output data.

== Software integration ==
OptQuest was initially released in 1998 as a spinout of the University of Colorado Boulder to be used with Crystal Ball simulation software (Decisioneering Inc.). OptQuest is frequently used as a plugin with various commercial simulation software to provide optimization capabilities (simulation-based optimization). These include:

- AnyLogic since 2002
- Arena
- FlexSim
- SIMUL8

== Alternatives ==
Simulation software ProModel integrates with optimization package SimRunner, which is based on genetic algorithms. Witness optimizer uses tabu search and simulated annealing algorithms.

== See also ==
- Simulation-based optimization
