= Justin Picard =

Swiss-Canadian engineer and entrepreneur

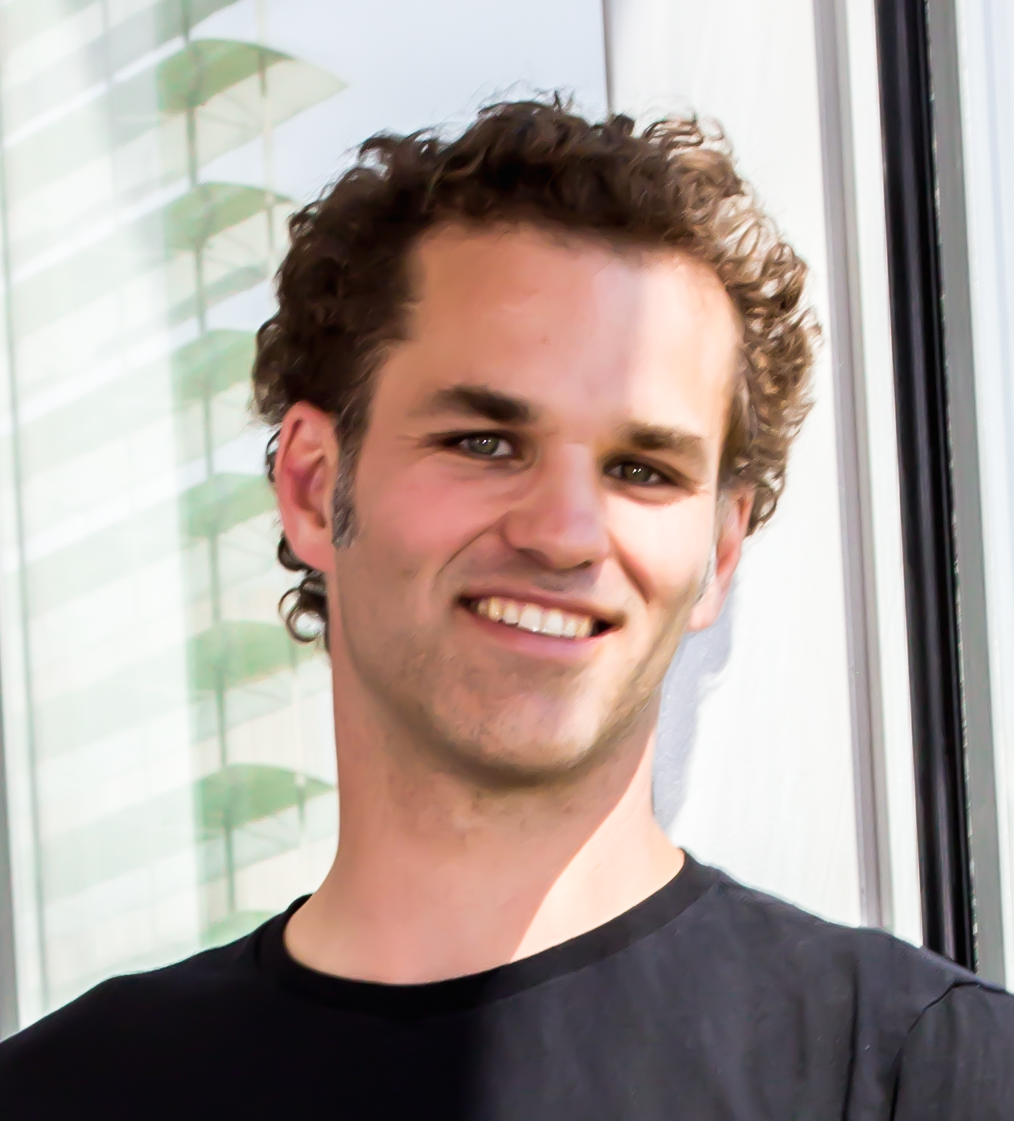
- Education: Polytechnique Montréal (BSc, MSc); University of Neuchâtel (PhD)
- Occupations: Engineer; entrepreneur
- Years active: 2001–present
- Title: Chief technology officer, Scantrust

Justin Picard is a Swiss-Canadian engineer and entrepreneur who currently serves as the chief technology officer of Scantrust, a company he co-founded in 2013. He is the inventor of the copy detection pattern (CDP), a digital authentication technology for detecting product and document counterfeiting.

Picard is a member of the Organisation for Economic Co-operation and Development's Task Force on Countering Illicit Trade, and the network of experts at the Global Initiative Against Transnational Organized Crime. He is also a co-founder of the non-governmental organisation Black Market Watch, where he developed a methodology to assess the impacts of illicit trade.

== Education and career ==
Picard grew up in Montreal, Canada. He attended Polytechnique Montréal, where he received a Bachelor of Science degree in physics and engineering in 1994, and later a Master of Science degree in engineering in 1997. He received a PhD in computer science from the University of Neuchâtel in 2000, before going to the École Polytechnique Fédérale de Lausanne for postdoctoral research in digital watermarking, focusing on the problem of securing products and documents against counterfeiting. During his PhD, Picard applied probabilistic argumentation systems to information retrieval systems.

Picard began his career in 2001 as a research and development engineer at Mediasec Technologies in Providence, Rhode Island. In 2004, he moved to Thomson Technicolor to work as head of their research and development in Essen, Germany, before joining Advanced Track & Trace as chief scientist in 2006. In his role at the company, he developed a technology that aids businesses in improving their brand protection and security. From 2009 to 2014, he was a member of the World Economic Forum Global Agenda Council on illicit trade.

In 2013, Picard left Advanced Track & Trace and co-founded Scantrust with chief executive officer Nathan J. Anderson and lead engineer Paul Landry, developing their company's technology at the École Polytechnique Fédérale de Lausanne. Prior to his role as chief technology officer, he served as the company's chief executive officer. He was also a 2025 IEEE Signal Processing Society Distinguished Industry Speaker.
