= Mobility Testbed =

MobilityTestbed
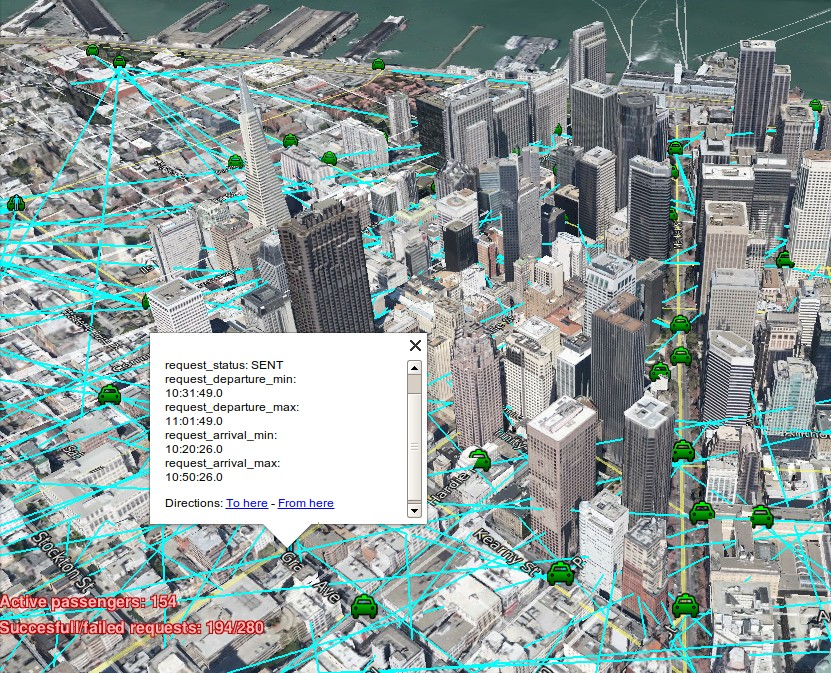
- Developer(s): Agent Technology Center, Czech Technical University in Prague
- Initial release: October 2013
- Stable release: 2.0 / 28 July 2014; 10 years ago
- Repository: github.com/agents4its/mobilitytestbed
- Platform: Java
- Type: Multi-agent simulation, Simulation software
- License: GNU General Public License

MobilityTestbed, formerly known as DARP Simulation Testbed, is an open-source, interaction-rich Multi-agent simulation model designed to test and evaluate various Dial-a-ride problem algorithms or other central or decentralized coordination or Resource allocation mechanisms within on-demand transportation systems. The testbed is built on top of the AgentPolis platform and employs a discrete event simulation paradigm.

== See also ==
- Dial-a-ride
- Multi-agent simulation
- Discrete event simulation
- List of computer simulation software
