= ISAAC Dynamics =

- Developer: StrutturaInformatica
- Stable release: 3.0 / June 1, 2017; 9 years ago
- Written in: Java
- Operating system: Windows XP/Windows Vista/Windows 7/Windows 10/macOS/Linux
- License: Proprietary
- Website: ISAAC Dynamic product page

ISAAC Dynamics is a dynamic simulation software developed by StrutturaInformatica. The main purpose of ISAAC Dynamics is the dynamic simulation of engineering processes for conventional and renewable power plants. ISAAC Dynamics has been developed over Java platform and it runs on many of the most common operating systems.

== History ==
ISAAC Dynamics was created in 2007 in Florence (Italy) from the idea of a group of process and computer engineers working at StrutturaInformatica. In that period of time, the company's customers (ENEL and ENEA) put forward the need for a dynamic software for the analysis of CSP (Parabolic Trough) plant. In the following years, ISAAC Dynamics has been adopted by other companies like China General Nuclear Power Group (Renewable sector), Techint, Alstom, RSE, etc. The libraries have been then extended to other fields in order to provide a complete tool for the process simulation. In the meantime StrutturaInformatica was present to several conferences as author like SolarPACES and Zero Emission.

== Product ==
ISAAC Dynamics is a tool used to perform dynamic simulation of process in the main fields of engineering. ISAAC Dynamics is used mainly in:

- Renewable Field (mainly concentrated solar power based applications);
- Conventional Field (Combined cycle, Integrated gasification combined cycle, ...);
- Hybrid Systems Field (ISCC, ...);

ISAAC Dynamics is used in order to:

- perform dynamic simulations focused on certain parts of a plant; detailed study of the process and in-depth analysis of particular components;
- perform simulation of entire plant;
- pre-dimensioning of components;
- perform feasibility studies and economical assessments.

== Software structure ==
=== Main Window ===
ISAAC Dynamics opens presenting the main window where the user can select what to do. It mainly consists of:

1. Builder Interface;
2. Dynamic Model Interface;
3. Tables Interface
4. Custom module creator.

=== Builder Interface ===
The Builder Interface is the interface that the user can use to create the model, with the drag and drop system, browsing the libraries included in the software divided into:

- Water/Steam;
- Molten Salt;
- Synthetic Oil;
- Gas;
- RealGas (these blocks use more than 120 components - pure fluids and mixtures - that can be combined to create new mixtures);
- Concentrated Solar Power components;
- Regulation blocks;
- Utilities;
- Miscellaneous;

The user can create its own library composed by customized blocks.

=== Dynamic Model Interface ===
In this environment the user can run the model previously created in the builder interface, setting a set of parameters as:

- simulations speed;
- calculation toleration;
- integration time step.

It is also possible to extract new model starting from a particular time during the simulation, open trends and extract data from the simulation in Microsoft Excel documents.

=== Tables Interface ===
Using this function, the user can browse the thermodynamic properties regarding the fluids included in the platform.

=== Custom Module Creator ===
The user can also create customized modules using the template provided in the software; the language used for the equations implementation is Java.

== See also ==
- List of computer simulation software
- Computer simulation
- Water table
- Java
