= Simcad Pro =

Simulation software by CreateASoft Inc.

- Original authors: CreateASoft, Inc
- Developers: CreateASoft, Inc
- Stable release: Simcad Pro 15
- Operating system: Windows 7 SP1, Windows 8, Windows 8.1, Windows 10, Windows 11
- Available in: English
- Type: Process simulation
- Website: www.createasoft.com

Simcad Pro is a process simulation and digital twin software developed by CreateASoft Inc. used for simulating process-based environments including manufacturing, warehousing, supply lines, logistics, and healthcare. It is a tool used for planning, organizing, optimizing, and engineering real process-based systems. Simcad Pro allows the creation of a virtual computer model, which can be manipulated by the user and represents a real environment. Using the model, it is possible to test for efficiency as well as locate points of improvement among the process flow. Simcad Pro's dynamic computer model also allows for changes to occur while the model is running for a fully realistic simulation. It can also be integrated with live and historical data.

Simulation software is part of a broader category of Industry 4.0 technologies, or technologies that move organizations to digitization of operations.

== Model Building ==
=== User Interface ===
Simcad Pro has a user-friendly graphical user interface for building virtual models of process-based environments, and the entire model can be built and edited without coding, including any advanced model characteristics. In addition to this, Simcad Pro allows for data import from almost any data source, including Microsoft Access, Excel, Visio, and SQL Server databases for easier model creation. Simcad Pro also supports real-time tracking using devices including RFID tags and barcode scanners. Models can be viewed in 2D, 3D, and virtual reality environments. Simcad Pro supports several simulation approaches, including discrete-event simulation, agent-based simulation, stochastic modeling, continuous modeling, mathematical modeling, and motion modeling. Agent-based and discrete-event simulation can be used within the same model. Simcad Pro can also connect to live and historical data sources during simulation runs, including data from RFID tags, barcode scanners, and enterprise systems such as ERP, MES, and WMS platforms.

=== Simulation Engine ===
Simcad Pro uses a patented, multi-threaded, 64-bit simulation engine. Distinguishing it from the SIMAN simulation engine used in many competing software products. Models built with the Simcad engine feature patented "On-The-Fly" simulation, meaning that models can be manipulated, edited, and transformed as they are performing a simulation run.

=== Digital Twin Studio ===
Digital Twin Studio is a related CreateASoft product within the company’s simulation and digital-twin software portfolio. CreateASoft describes Digital Twin Studio Desktop as the successor name for Simcad Elite. Digital Twin Studio is presented as a broader real-time digital twin application, with Digital Twin Studio Desktop and related software positioned within that product family.

Industry listings from MHI and ProMat have also described Digital Twin Studio in connection with CreateASoft’s simulation and digital-twin software offerings.

=== Licensing ===
Simcad Pro is available through commercial licensing. A limited free version, Simcad Lite, has also been made available for download. Educational and university licenses are available as well.

== Applied Industries ==
Any industry engaged in a process-flow environment can use Simcad Pro to model their operations. The main industries where Simcad Pro is used are manufacturing, warehousing, supply chain & logistics, and healthcare.

=== Manufacturing ===
Simcad Pro can be used to simulate manufacturing operations, with the most common goals being to:

- Optimize production schedules
- Optimize labor allocation
- Perform capacity analysis and growth projection
- Manage and reduce WIP
- Identify bottlenecks and constraints
- Optimize facility layout

Simcad Pro supports high-mix manufacturing operations with the ability to model:

- Detailed part routing
- Multiple sub-assemblies/components and detailed BOM support
- Tooling and manpower constraints
- Work orders, detailed cell implementation and sequencing
- Kanban pull and material handling

=== Warehousing ===
Simcad Pro can be used to simulate warehouses and distribution centers, with the most common goals being to:

- Optimize pick paths
- Perform congestion analysis
- Optimize staging areas
- Analyze receiving and put-away operations
- Optimize slotting
- Validate and implement automation
- Analyze storage media

=== Supply Chain & Logistics ===
Simcad Pro can be used to simulate supply chains and logistics operations, with the most common goals being to:

- Manage inventory and delivery to ensure product availability
- Determine optimal locations for distribution centers
- Determine impact of changes to supply and demand
- Reduce transportation costs
- Optimize delivery routes
- Plan capacity and scheduling changes
- Reduce delivery lead time

=== Healthcare ===
Simcad Pro can be used to simulate healthcare operations, such as emergency rooms and operating rooms, with the most common goals being to:

- Optimize patient flow and reduce patient wait times
- Optimize bed allocation
- Analyze length-of-stay
- Optimize staff utilization and scheduling
- Optimize ED capacity planning
- Optimize OR department scheduling & efficiency

== Version History ==
Version No.	Released	Main Updates & Features
17.0	July. 2026	3D Graphics Engine Enhancements; Support for export 3D model to DTStudio Live; Support for export 3D Animation to DTSTudio Live; Enhanced heat maps, spaghetti diagrams and constestion; Neural Network with unlimited node capability; Integrated Python engine; Animation control for 3d components; Interface and support for large high DPI Monitors.
16.3	Jan. 2023	Digital Twin Studio integration; AI/ML capabilities
15	Jan. 2022	Support for building SCARA robots, Gantry robots, and three-axis robots; Updated visual process effect editor; Automatically display color-coded process analytics; Updated interface icons; Updated library of process images
14.0	Feb. 2020	Smart Entities; Interactive VR; Time Lapse Heat Maps, Spaghetti Diagrams, and Congestion Maps; Rack Density Analysis; Auto Rack Creation; Goods-to-Person Support; Moving/Mobile Robots; Faster Execution
13.0	Mar. 2018	New and improved 3D engine with more light effects, shadows, and material support; Improved built in wizards to create fully functional racks, ASRS, allowing for dynamic rack and ASRS updates; Improved search and replace feature designed to simplify extension tracking and updates; Enhanced simulation engine to make better use of multi-core processors; Support for IGES/Step file format; File size optimization and enhanced base module support; Enhanced zoom and display support; Expanded external module import/export with support for base module controls; Speed improvement for large models (more than 3000 processes); Additional Racks and Warehouse images; Tree based structure for the Internal Base modules; In addition to a number of fixes and improvements
12	Jan. 2016	64-bit simulation engine with no limitations on model size or complexity.; Improved model run time and simulation engine optimization.; Animated GIF files now supported in 2D. Animate people walking, interacting with equipment and equipment motion in 2D using the new .gif file support.; Improved Collision Detection; Improved Data Import sortation, filtering, and display; Improved VB Scripting and Debugging; Expanded and improved custom report generator with expanded support for Excel and Database integration; Improved window display and sizing; 3D file open/preview provides a quick preview of the 3D library; the 3D library includes people, machines, equipment, handling equipment, office and healthcare specific components.; Model Annotations now in 3D.
11.0	Aug. 2013	Ribbon Style Interface; Dockable and Auto-Hide Windows; Expanded model area; Quick Access to multiple views for model validation and model settings; Pan Mode; Layer Designation; Improved module functionality; Toggle through overlapping connection lines; Quick Object and Process Access through expanded Model tree; Improved connection line control; Improved Collision Detection; Increased Simulation Speed; Improved Object Rotation and Positioning in 3D; Custom Distributions and Data Fitting; Ask User prompt for models that utilize Excel(R) files; Expanded resource utilization analysis; Soft Reset of Simulation Engine, resets data collection and re-initializes the engine useful to restart the data collection and reset model parameters; New reporting to capture data points at various intervals throughout the simulation. Useful to capture lead time, travel distance, and other statistics as objects progress from process to process
10.0	Jun. 2011	SIMCAD ONLINE: With Simcad Pro Elite, users have access to Simcad Online, providing the ability to display the simulation model remotely via web interface; 3D Visualization now includes ANIMATED 3D Objects; Process and connection timing supporting rates on an object, weight and volume basis for continuous flow modeling; Improved shift definition interface, including the ability to define holiday schedules; SimTrack now allows timing merge; Model Image/Visual Push to Web Interface/Dashboard - User Defined Interval; Improved Process Timing definition; Process Routing can now be determined at various times during the sequence - critical for animated 3D objects; Improved Results Process update interval definition; Improved control over object disassembly; Improved user access to simulation date and time values; Schedule in report/spreadsheet format is now automatically generated
9.0	2008	New Interface to simplify model building steps and provide a simplified interface for basic vs. advanced modeling; Improved dynamic environment to allow for the addition of processes during the simulation run; Excel Import/Export Wizard; Scenario editor designed to simplify scenario analysis; Wizard tool to enable the addition of model constraints and parameters quickly; Improved 3D environment with added support for more file formats including SolidWorks 3D files; Rollback feature that keeps track of your changes and stores model revision; Resource schedule generator that provides the location and time spent per resource in a Gantt chart format; Model tree – Displays the tree version of the model including all the process and connection line properties; Advanced Conveyor controls; Visio integration; Process detail view with external document linking/connectivity; Enhanced displays for onscreen KPIs
8.0	Jul. 2007	Identify, justify, and prioritize process improvement opportunities; Increase efficiency; Reduce receiving and put-away time; Optimize picking strategies; Identify optimal shipping schedules; Reduce cross traffic flow, improve safety, and increase efficiency; Design an optimized facility layout; Increase capacity and throughput without increasing costs; Increase project ROI and maximize return on process improvement spending
7.0	Feb. 2005	Initial release

== See also ==
- List of discrete event simulation software
- Discrete event simulation
- List of computer simulation software
- Simulation in manufacturing systems
