= Algoryx Simulation AB =

Software development company based in Umeå, Sweden

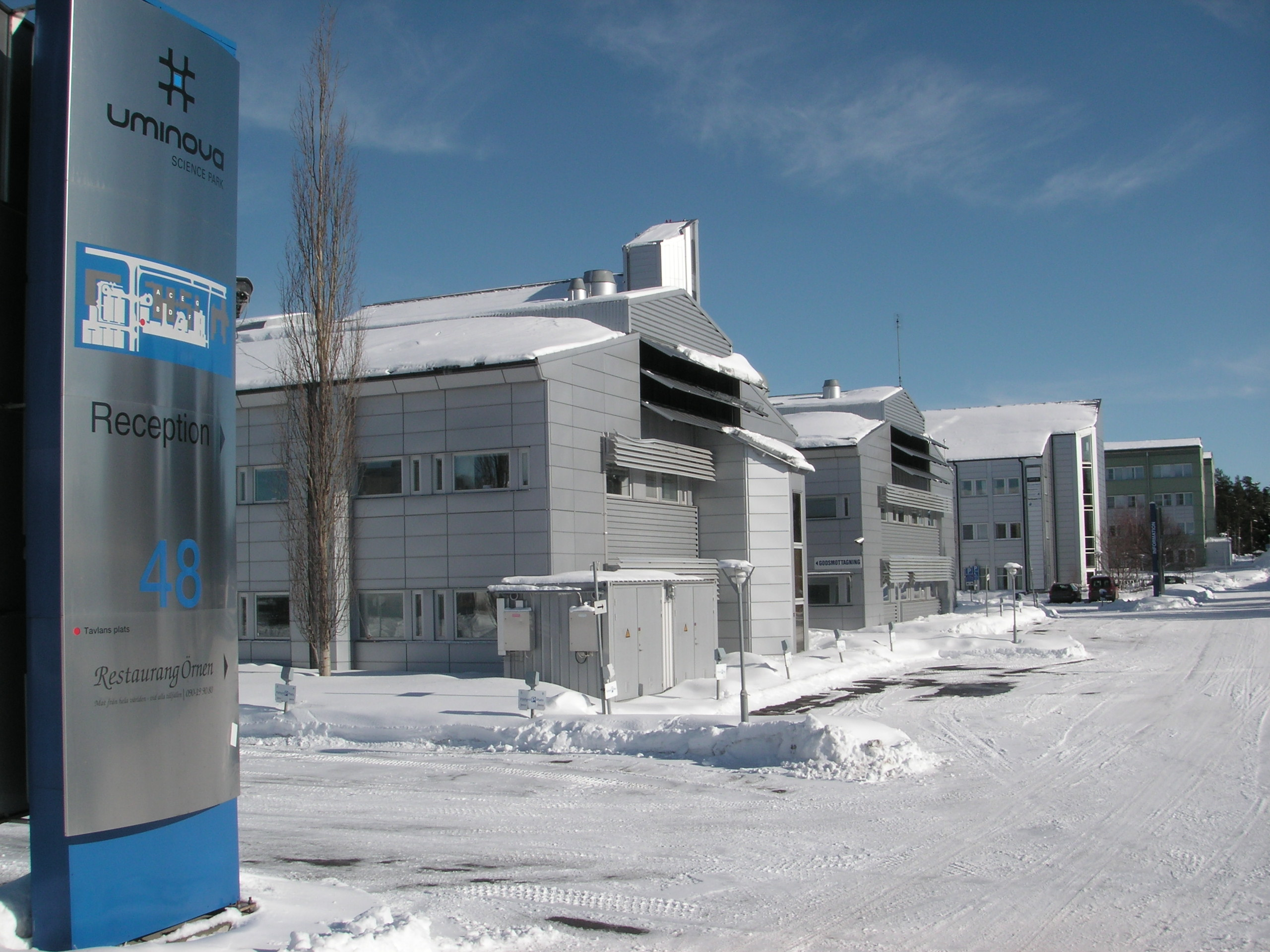
- Uminova Science Park, Umeå, Sweden
- Industry: Industrial simulations
- Founded: 2007; 19 years ago in Umeå, Sweden
- Founders: Kenneth Bodin, Anders Backman, Martin Servin, Claude Lacoursiere
- Headquarters: Uminova Science Park, Umeå, Sweden
- Key people: Kenneth Bodin, CEO
- Products: Physics engine, simulation software
- Brands: AgX Dynamics, Dynamics for SpaceClaim, Algodoo
- Owners: The founders, Oryx Simulations
- Number of employees: 15 (July 2016)
- Website: www.algoryx.se

Algoryx Simulation AB was formed in 2007 in Umeå, Sweden as a spin-off company from Umeå University. Algoryx currently has three products: Algodoo (formerly Phun), Dynamics for SpaceClaim, and AGX Dynamics, a professional physics engine for engineering and real-time simulations.

== History ==
Algoryx's first product was AgX Dynamics, a multifunctional physics engine for simulators in industrial applications, prepared both for use together with CAD tools and with game engines such as Unity3D.

A later product is Algodoo, an elementary school physics simulation program based on the 2-dimensional physics engine Phun, the first versions of which were written as a thesis by Emil Ernerfeldt, then a student of engineering computer science at the university. The first version of Algodoo was launched on August 31, 2009, and in 2013 the program was released as free to download versions for Windows, Mac and iOS (iPad).

In the spring of 2015, an office was also opened in Munich, Germany, after the company, among other things, concluded an agreement with German Rheinmetall on simulators for cranes and vehicles.

In the autumn of 2017, Algoryx began a collaboration with the Japanese research institute National Institute of Advanced Science and Technology to develop simulation technology for robots to be used in the cleanup work around the Fukushima nuclear power plant, which was destroyed in a 2011 earthquake.

== Awards ==
In February 2011, Algoryx was selected for the list of Top-20 companies to represent Swedish Innovation, by the Swedish Institute, a Swedish government agency. In March 2011, Algoryx was ranked as one of Sweden's most promising young high tech companies by business magazine Affärsvärlden and tech news paper Ny Teknik. Algoryx again won this award in March 2012. In May 2011, Algoryx was selected by Red Herring for the Top 100 list of the most innovative companies in Europe. In 2012, Algoryx was named to represent Sweden in the European Business Awards. Later that year, Algoryx was also listed on the Deloitte Sweden Fast Technology 50 list. In the spring of 2015, an office was also opened in Munich, Germany, after the company entered into an agreement with German Rheinmetall on simulators for cranes and vehicles.
