= Collision resolution =

"Collision resolution" may refer to:

- Hash table implementations in computer science
- Collision response in classical mechanics

Compare:

- Collision avoidance (networking) in telecommunications
