= Automation Studio =

Documentation software

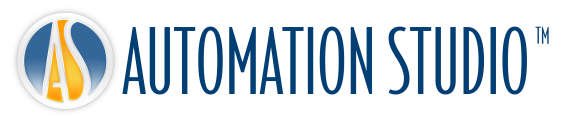
- Developer: Famic Technologies Inc.
- Stable release: P10.0/E10.0
- Written in: C++, C#, Ruby
- Operating system: Windows 8.1 and later
- Type: Simulation, prototyping, systems design
- License: Proprietary software
- Website: www.famictech.com

Automation Studio is a circuit design, simulation and project documentation software for fluid power systems and electrical projects conceived by Famic Technologies Inc. It is used for CAD, maintenance, and training purposes. Mainly used by engineers, trainers, and service and maintenance personnel. Automation Studio can be applied in the design, training and troubleshooting of hydraulics, pneumatics, HMI, and electrical control systems.
