= Project management simulation =

Project management simulation is a simulation used for project management training and analysis. Project management simulation is often used as training simulation for project managers. In other cases it is used for what-if analysis and for supporting decision-making in real projects. Frequently the simulation is conducted using software tools.

== Training ==
Project management simulation for training is an interactive learning activity frequently practiced as a group exercise. The purpose of the simulation is to impart to students the competencies (i.e. knowledge, skills, and attitudes) that will ultimately improve their performance. It confronts trainees with the situations and problems that arise in real world projects. Trainees see the consequences of the decisions they make. They can track the evolution of the project parameters: scope, costs, schedule, and quality, as well as human factors. The simulation gives students a chance to work through typical project problems, to make mistakes and to analyze them. Pedagogic goals of project management simulation are to:

- determine goal and objectives of a project
- estimate cost
- plan tasks of the project
- plan resources in a project
- use project management tools
- control the progress of a project
- make team decisions under stress
- react appropriately in typical project management situations

Some studies suggest that using Simulation based training for training project managers is superior to other methods.

== Analysis ==
Project management simulation is used to analyze real projects. The goal of the simulation is to show the user the different possible outcomes of his decisions, along with the probability that each outcome will occur. The simulation helps in reducing the project risk and in choosing the best project plan. In a typical simulation the project is first modeled into a software tool along with uncertain variables. A simulation is then run to check the different possible outcomes and their probability as a result of different inputs for the uncertain variables.

== See also ==
- Case study
- Project management
- Project manager
- Serious game
- Simulation game
- Simulation
- Training simulation
- Project team builder
- Sensitivity analysis
