= EFDC Explorer =

EFDC+ Explorer
- Developer(s): DSI, LLC
- Stable release: EFDC+ Explorer 11.8.2 / March, 2024
- Preview release: EFDC+ Explorer 12.1 / July, 2024
- Written in: C# .NET
- Operating system: Windows XP, Windows Vista, Windows 7, Windows 8, Windows 8.1, Windows 10, Windows 11, Windows Server (2012)
- Platform: Microsoft Windows, Linux (EFDC only)
- Size: ~220 MB
- Available in: English
- Website: www.eemodelingsystem.com//

EFDC+ Explorer (formerly EFDC_Explorer) (EE) is a Windows-based GUI for pre- and post processing of the Environmental Fluid Dynamics Code (EFDC). The program is developed and supported by the engineering company DSI. EFDC+ Explorer is designed to support model set-up, grid generation (Cartesian and orthogonal curvilinear), testing, calibration, and visualization of model results (Craig, 2020). EE supports hydrodynamics, sediment/toxics transport, particle tracking and the coupled water quality model HEM3D.

EFDC was originally developed at Virginia Institute of Marine Science (Hamrick, 1992). It is open-source software and is a widely used, EPA accepted model. DSI continues to develop EFDC using the name EFDC+. Enhancements include adding multithreading capability and more recently full parallel computing with MPI (Message Passing Interface). EFDC+ Explorer is part of the EE Modeling System (EEMS) which includes EFDC+, the enhanced version of EFDC, and Grid+, a curvilinear Cartesian grid generator, which replaces the earlier CVLGrid.

A plugin for US EPA's watershed management and TMDL development tool, BASINS, was recently developed. This allows BASINS to create EFDC+ models.

== EFDC+/EFDC+ Explorer Functions ==
- EFDC Pre- & Post-Processing
- 2D & 3D Animations
- Model Results Visualization
- Data vs. Model Comparisons
- Real-time data processing and simulation

Simulation of:

- Hydrodynamics
- Sediment transport
- Chemical fate & transport
- Water quality
- Shellfish farms
- Wave impacts and wind wave generation
- Lagrangian Particle Tracking
- Ice Formation and Melt
- Marine Hydrokinetics
- Habitat analysis using Instream Flow Incremental Method
- Propeller Wash

== Example applications ==
EFDC+ Explorer has been in distribution since 2003, and is now being used in over 60 countries.

Newtown Creek, New York City: Newtown Creek was proposed as a potential Superfund site in September 2009, and received that designation on September 27, 2010. EFDC and EFDC+ Explorer are being used to support the remedial investigation and feasibility study to prepare for environmental remediation.

Ohio River, USA: "This model of the Ohio River was designed to assist in a storm impacts study for Cincinnati City. The study related to the evaluation of combined sewer overflows (CSOs) and other wet weather impacts on the water quality on the Ohio River, and to evaluate resulting benefits from certain abatement scenarios."

Lake Washington, WA, "DSI has developed the Lake Washington Real-time Temperature Simulation as an example of a real-time data and modeling facility to serve the scientific community in Seattle, Washington, US."
