= Scantrust =

Swiss information technology company

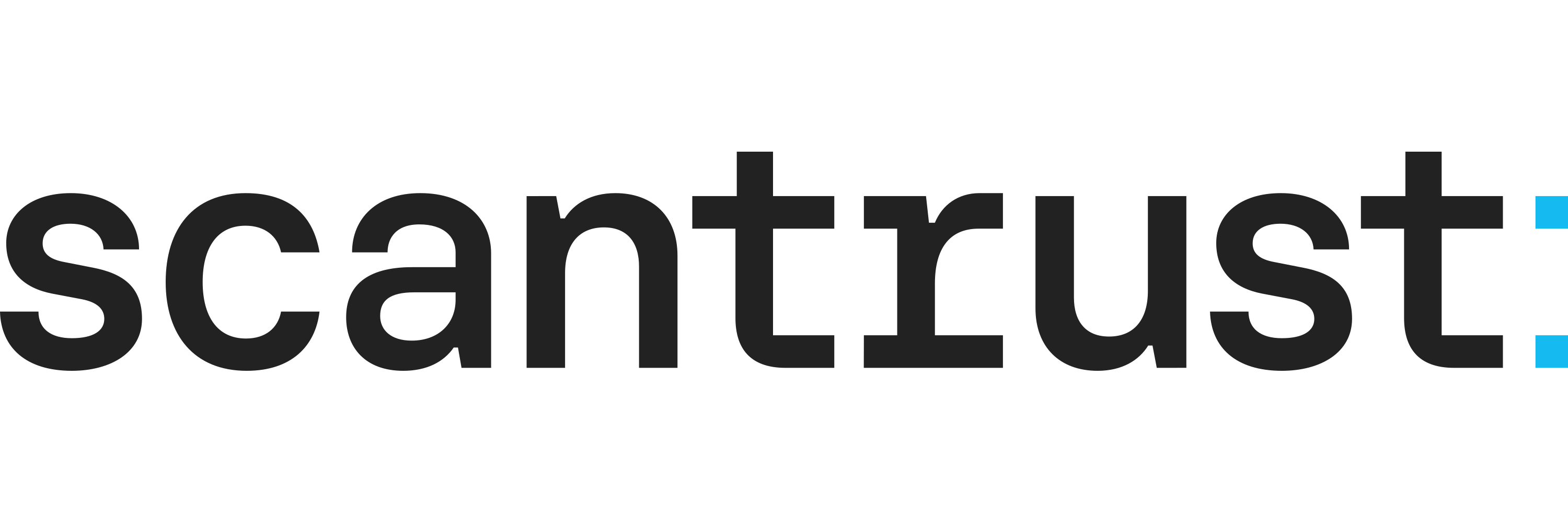
- Scantrust logo since 2020
- Type: Privately held company
- Industry: Software as a service
- Founded: 2013
- Founder: Justin Picard, Nathan J. Anderson, Paul Landry
- Headquarters: Lausanne, Switzerland
- Services: Brand protection, supply chain traceability, smart packaging
- Website: www.scantrust.com

Scantrust is a Swiss company that provides enterprise software for product authentication and supply chain traceability.

Scantrust offers traceability for various industries, such as luxury goods, food products, industrial machines, water filters, cables, agrochemical products, and fiscal stamps. Nathan J. Anderson is the CEO.

== History ==
Justin Picard, Nathan J. Anderson, and Paul Landry founded Scantrust at the end of 2013. A seed round led by SOSV was raised in 2015, and a series A led by Credit Suisse was raised in 2017. In 2016, the company concluded a partnership with Agfa-Gevaert to integrate its technologies into Agfa's security software. In 2017, the National Seeds Institute of Argentina released a fiscal stamp printed with Scantrust secure QR Code. In 2018, the company entered into a partnership with Hyperledger and began offering services using Hyperledger Sawtooth. In 2019, the Dutch Standards organisation NEN announced they would use Scantrust secure QR codes to ensure the authenticity of their certificates. The same year, Scantrust entered into a partnership with HP Indigo for labels printed with HP commercial printers. In 2020, Scantrust entered into a partnership with SAP to deliver end-to-end traceability.

== Product authentication and traceability ==
The company has developed a QR Code system with an additional layer of protection against copying, based on inserting a copy detection pattern or secure graphic which loses information when it is copied. The technology does not require special materials, inks, and modifications to printing equipment to implement. Related product authentication and traceability data can be stored into a blockchain.

QR codes used in Scantrust authentication and traceability systems are printed on product packaging and scanned with a smartphone to authenticate and track products. The company provides a free app to consumers which can be used to scan products with the copy detection pattern and help detect counterfeits. Scanning of a code with a smartphone can also offer a traceability feature with origin and supply chain information made about the product made available An enterprise app is also provided for employees, distributors and forensic inspections.
