= Lanner Group =

American software company

Lanner
- Type: Private Limited company
- Founded: 1996 (following a management buyout from AT&T Istel) Acquired by Haskoning in 2019
- Headquarters: Birmingham, United Kingdom
- Key people
- Website: www.lanner.com

Lanner Group Ltd is a software company specialising in simulation software such as discrete event simulation and predictive simulation, headquartered in Birmingham, UK. The business develops, markets and supports business process simulation and optimisation systems. The company has subsidiaries in the US, China, France and Germany and a distributor network selling the company's products in 20 different countries. Lanner Group was formed following a Management Buyout of AT&T Istel, a spin-off from the operational research department of British Leyland where, in 1978, the world's first visual interactive simulation tool was developed. Lanner Group services automotive, aviation, criminal justice, defence and aerospace, financial services and contact centres, food and beverage, health, logistics and supply chain, manufacturing, nuclear, oil and gas, pharmaceutical, and consumer health industries.

== Company history ==
Lanner Group formed in 1996 after completing a Management Buyout from AT&T Istel; the company was initially named SEE WHY SOLUTIONS and was incorporated in 1995. Lanner Group's previous owner, AT&T Istel, formerly known as ISTEL, was initially called BL Systems, and was a spin out formed in 1979 following a Merger of all the computer departments under the then British Leyland umbrella. BL System's SEE WHY tool, programmed in Fortran 77 and launched in 1980, was the world's first commercially available visual interactive simulation package and the precursor to Lanner Group's current core software product WITNESS. WITNESS was the first of the industrial strength 4GL simulators. The WITNESS system was launched on IBM PC in 1986 and has been revised frequently since. The latest version of Lanner's Witness was released in summer 2017.

The applications of the FORTRAN 77 / WITNESS interface have been subject to further academic Research and Development. Since 1985 the company has supported its simulation software academic program. Over 100 universities worldwide have been involved since the program began.

Lanner Group continued to develop the WITNESS platform further in parallel to developing its mainstay product of the same name, and since 2002 has introduced new systems providing niche simulation packages for police and healthcare organisations called PRISM and PX-Sim respectively. In 2006 the company unveiled a Java based simulation engine called L-SIM which is embedded in Business Process Management (BPM) solutions software. In May the same year, a technology partnership with BPM solution provider IDS Scheer was announced. The L-SIM product is now the simulation engine of IDS Scheer's ARIS Business Simulator. The company's WITNESS platform technology is therefore embedded into current Oracle, SAP, and IBM BPA products.

From 1996 to 2010 the company's main investor was private equity company 3i. On 18 March 2010 Lanner Group announced that it had secured a £3 million new investment deal with NVM Private Equity replacing 3i. 3i continues to retain an interest in Lanner Group as a small minority investor.

In January 2019, Lanner (and its Witness software) was acquired by Dutch engineering and consultancy firm Royal HaskoningDHV (now known as Haskoning).
