= AGX Dynamics =

- Developer(s): Algoryx Simulation AB
- Stable release: 2.38.0.0 / June 28, 2024; 12 months ago
- Operating system: Microsoft Windows, OS X, Linux
- Type: Physics engine
- License: Commercial proprietary software
- Website: algoryx.se

AGX Dynamics (previously known as AGX Multiphysics) is a proprietary real-time physics engine developed by Algoryx Simulation AB that simulates rigid body dynamics, collision detection, dry frictional contacts, jointed systems, motors, fluids, deformable materials, hydraulics, hydrodynamics, cable systems and wires. AGX targets several domains, such as virtual reality real-time simulator applications for training and marketing; computer aided engineering and virtual prototyping; movie visual effects; and education. For education, components of AGX are used in the end-user software product Algodoo also developed and sold by Algoryx. Users of AGX simulate e.g. granular systems, construction equipment, forestry machines, mining processes and machines, biomechanics, industrial robots, ship and anchor handling processes and cranes. AGX is often integrated with 3D visualization frameworks such as OpenSceneGraph, OGRE, Unity and Unreal Engine and often also with actual hardware and control systems of the real-world version of the simulator. AGX is integrated in many 3D modeling and CAD systems, including Algoryx Momentum for ANSYS Discovery (formerly SpaceClaim).

AGX has been under active development since 2007. It usually has about 3 major releases per year.

== History ==
AGX is developed by Algoryx Simulation AB, a private limited company established in Umeå, Sweden in 2007, as a spin-off from Umeå University. In February 2011, Algoryx was selected for the list of Top-20 companies to represent Swedish Innovation, by the Swedish Institute, a Swedish government agency. In March 2011, Algoryx was ranked as one of Sweden's most promising young high tech companies by business magazine Affärsvärlden and tech news paper Ny Teknik. In May 2011, Algoryx was selected by Red Herring for the Top 100 list of the most innovative companies in Europe.
