= Adaptive Simulations =

Swedish software company

- Type: Private
- Industry: Computer Aided Engineering and Computational Fluid Dynamics
- Founded: 2015
- Headquarters: Stockholm, Sweden
- Area served: Worldwide
- Website: www.ingridcloud.com

Adaptive Simulations is a Sweden-based organization that offers fully automated, cloud-based flow simulations and design optimization in a Software-as-a-Service model.

== Background ==
Adaptive Simulations was founded in 2015 as a spin-out from the research conducted on automated simulations at Royal Institute of Technology (KTH), Stockholm. The company is led by Sebastian Desand, the CEO.

In 2017, Adaptive Simulations was one of the finalists for the Sweden's “Entrepreneur of the Future” award. In the same year, the company was one among the top 50 finalists at the Pioneers500 awards.

== Grants and Funding ==
Adaptive Simulations has been awarded three grants. In 2014, the team received a grant from European Research Council (ERC). In 2016, the company received two grants from Swedish agency for innovation and growth (VINNOVA) and the EU-commission as a part of Horizon2020-programme for disruptive innovations.

In May 2017, the company raised €1.5 million funds from Karma Ventures, and Creathor Venture, along with the participation from KTH Holding.

== Platform ==
The product innovation behind Adaptive Simulations is enabled by adaptive algorithms, based on the research experiments in the areas of numerical analysis, Computational Fluid Dynamics (CFD) and computer science at KTH Institute. These adaptive algorithms are said to make the simulation process less complex, for the inexperienced users.
