= EWorkexperience =

Online platform

eWorkexperience
- Founded: 2004; 22 years ago in London, United Kingdom
- Founder: Keji Giwa
- Services: Project Management; Business Analysis; Digital Marketing; Training

eWork experience is an online platform created by Digital Bananas Technology for career insights. The online platform utilizes eLearning, eCollaboration, and eMentoring, through live digital projects that are accessible remotely. It help candidates apply their learning, receive hands on training and gain practical experience in digital project management and business analysis.

== The eWork experience platform ==
This software primarily provides a KPI tracking platform, as well as access to instant messaging.

== History ==
The eWork experience platform was officially launched in 2014, as a collaborative learning platform offered by Career Insights. Since launching, the eWork experience has increased job offers by 30% from previous success in the United Kingdom and is now preparing to use the platform to help well-educated people with no work experience in sub-saharan Africa to gain international work experience.

The platform gets candidates to work on live projects from their homes while being trained on the job, with access to cloud based tools and software.
