= Discrete rate simulation =

Way of modeling systems that involve the rate-based movement or flow of material

In the field of simulation, a discrete rate simulation models the behavior of mixed discrete and continuous systems. This methodology is used to simulate linear continuous systems, hybrid continuous and discrete-event systems, and any other system that involves the rate-based movement or flow of material from one location to another.

Discrete rate simulation was developed in the early 1990s at Simulation Dynamics, Inc. by Andrew Siprelle and colleagues. The methodology retains the discrete-event clock while moving flow through a system at rates that maintain mass balance; it was first published at the 1995 Winter Simulation Conference, and the term "discrete rate simulation" was established in the authors' subsequent work. Imagine That Inc. later built a second-generation, linear-programming-based implementation upon the first-generation model.

== Areas of application ==
Industrial areas where discrete rate simulation is used include:

- Bulk material handling (e.g. minerals and ores, powders, particles, mixed wastes, wood chips)
- Liquids and gases
- Pulp and paper processing
- Oil and gas pipelines
- Traffic
- High speed/volume production lines in the food & beverage, consumer products, and pharmaceutical industries.

== Compared to discrete-event and continuous simulation ==
Discrete rate simulation combines the event-based timing of discrete event simulation and the continuous variables calculations found in continuous simulation. It predicts and schedules events when the system needs to calculate a new set of rates and determines the appropriate rate of flow for each branch or stream.

A comparison between discrete rate, continuous, and discrete event simulation

Discrete rate simulation is similar to discrete event simulation in that both methodologies model the operation of the system as a discrete sequence of events in time. However, while discrete event simulation assumes there is no change in the system between consecutive events, in a discrete rate simulation model the flow continues to move at a constant rate such that, for example, the level in a tank could change. Another difference is that discrete event simulation models are overwhelmingly concerned with the status of system entities (discrete objects moving through the system) while discrete rate simulation models are concerned with the status (quantity and location) of homogeneous flow. For rate-based systems, discrete rate simulation has faster computational times and is more accurate in calculating mass balance compared to discrete event simulation.

Discrete rate simulation is also similar to continuous simulation in that it simulates homogeneous flow. In addition, both methods recalculate flow rates, which are continuous variables, whenever a state change occurs. However, discrete rate simulation S differs from continuous simulation in that it is event-based and does not simulate every time slice. Modeling linear flow systems using continuous simulation has limitations because it usually is unable to detect important events, such as a tank becoming full or empty, until after the event has occurred plus requires many more system recalculations during the course of the simulation.

== Example ==
An exercise in learning how to build discrete-rate simulations is to model a tank filling and emptying over time. The tank fills at a constant rate and empties at two different rates, one rate until it is full and a faster rate until it is empty. There are 4 types of events in the simulation: start simulation, storage full, storage empty, and end simulation. At each event the model determines which emptying rate to use; between events the emptying rate remains constant.
