= Akselos =

Swiss software company

Akselos SA
- Type: Privately held company
- Industry: Simulation software
- Founded: 2012
- Founder: Thomas Leurent, David Knezevic, Phuong Huynh
- Headquarters: Lausanne, Switzerland
- Services: Digital twins of energy infrastructure
- Website: www.akselos.com

Akselos is a Swiss company which provides an engineering simulation platform based on reduced-basis finite-element analysis. The platform is used to create digital twins of energy infrastructures in order to improve their design, maintenance, reliability and lifetime.

The company is headquartered in Lausanne at the EPFL Innovation Park, and has offices in Boston and Vietnam. Thomas Leurent is the current Akselos CEO.

== Company history ==
In 2011, technology from the Massachusetts Institute of Technology (MIT) project "High resolution simulations for system analysis" was spun out into Akselos. In 2012, the company was founded by David Knezevic, Thomas Leurent and Phuong Huynh, who were involved in the initial research.

Akselos raised a first round of investment of USD 2.2 million in 2016. A second round of investment of USD 10 million led by Innogy Ventures and Shell Ventures was raised in 2018.

In 2020, Akselos was selected as a World Economic Forum Technology Pioneer.

== Reduced-basis finite-element analysis technology ==
Between 2000 and 2011, reduced-basis finite-element analysis was developed in research laboratories from different universities, including MIT and Pierre and Marie Curie University. Akselos received a license from the MIT Technology licensing office on the development of the technology. Later on, Akselos collaborated with EPFL for the development of a simulation software for critical infrastructures.

The technology allows its user to perform simulations on a 3D physics-based digital model of an energy infrastructure, called a digital twin. To build the digital twin, all available data on the energy infrastructure asset needs first to be collected. The digital twin then allows the user to monitor reliability as well as predict potential failures and may help to extend the lifetime of assets. It is said by Akselos technology users that in some applications, the technology can be a thousand times faster than other methods. According to the company, the technology provides more details and accuracy than conventional finite element analysis when modelling large assets.
