= List of civil engineering software =

This is a list of civil engineering software used in the design, analysis, modeling, construction, and management of civil engineering projects. The software includes applications for structural engineering, geotechnical engineering, transportation engineering, hydraulic engineering, surveying, building information modeling, and computer-aided design.

- Proprietary
- Open source

== Structural design and building information modeling ==
Software	Developer	Operating system
ArchiCAD	Graphisoft	Windows, macOS
AutoCAD Civil 3D	Autodesk	Windows
AutoCAD LT	Autodesk	Windows, macOS
CSiBridge	Computers and Structures, Inc.	Windows
ETABS	Computers and Structures, Inc.	Windows
Extreme Loading for Structures	Extreme Loading for Structures Ltd.	Windows
FreeCAD	FreeCAD community	Windows, macOS, Linux
Grasshopper 3D	Robert McNeel & Associates	Windows, macOS
LUSAS	LUSAS	Windows, macOS, Linux
MicroStation	Bentley Systems	Windows
PLPAK	Structural Software Solutions	Windows
Prokon	Prokon Software	Windows
Realsoft 3D	Realsoft Oy	Windows
Revit	Autodesk	Windows
RFEM	Dlubal Software	Windows
SAP2000	Computers and Structures, Inc.	Windows
SketchUp	Trimble Inc.	Windows, macOS
STAAD	Bentley Systems	Windows
Tekla Structures	Trimble Inc.	Windows

== Finite element analysis ==
Software	Developer	Operating system
Abaqus	Dassault Systèmes	Windows, Linux
ANSYS	ANSYS, Inc.	Windows, Linux
Calculix	CalculiX community	Windows, Linux, macOS
COMSOL Multiphysics	COMSOL AB	Windows, macOS, Linux
FEATool Multiphysics	Precise Simulation Ltd.	Windows, macOS, Linux
FEMtools	Dynamic Design Solutions	Windows
OpenFOAM	OpenFOAM Foundation	Windows, macOS, Linux
OpenSees	PEER Center / community	Windows, Linux, Unix-like
SimScale	SimScale GmbH	Web

== Geotechnical engineering ==
Software	Developer	Operating system
PLAXIS	Bentley Systems	Windows
SEEP2D	Dr. Fred Tracy	Windows
SVFlux	SoilVision Systems Ltd.	Windows
SVSlope	SoilVision Systems Ltd.	Windows
UTEXAS	University of Texas at Austin	Windows

== Hydrology and water ==
Software	Developer	Operating system
EPANET	U.S. EPA	Windows
GMS	Aquaveo	Windows
GSSHA	USACE	Windows
HEC-1	USACE	Windows
HEC-HMS	USACE Hydrologic Engineering Center	Windows
HEC-RAS	USACE Hydrologic Engineering Center	Windows
FLOW-3D HYDRO	Flow Science, Inc.	Windows
MIKE 21	DHI	Windows
MIKE SHE	DHI	Windows
MODFLOW	U.S. Geological Survey	Windows
Storm Water Management Model	U.S. EPA	Windows
TELEMAC	EDF	Windows, Linux
Visual MODFLOW	Waterloo Hydrogeologic	Windows

== Geographic information systems ==
Software	Developer	Operating system
ArcGIS Pro	Esri	Windows
Global Mapper	Blue Marble Geographics	Windows
GRASS GIS	GRASS Development Team	Windows, macOS, Linux
QGIS	QGIS community	Windows, macOS, Linux

== Transportation engineering ==
Software	Developer	Operating system
MATSim	MATSim community / ETH Zurich	Windows, macOS, Linux
PTV Vissim	PTV Planung Transport Verkehr AG	Windows
Simulation of Urban MObility	German Aerospace Center / community	Windows, macOS, Linux
TransModeler	Caliper Corporation	Windows
TRANSYT	Transport Research Laboratory	Windows
TRANSYT-7F	McTrans Center (University of Florida)	Windows

== Construction management ==
Software	Developer	Operating system
Microsoft Project	Microsoft	Windows
Primavera	Oracle	Windows
PlanGrid	Autodesk	Web, iOS, Android
Procore	Procore Technologies	Web

== Building performance and energy analysis ==
Software	Developer	Operating system
EnergyPlus	United States Department of Energy	Windows, macOS, Linux
ESP-r	University of Strathclyde	Linux
IDA ICE	EQUA Simulation AB	Windows
OpenStudio	National Renewable Energy Laboratory	Windows, macOS, Linux
Radiance	Greg Ward	Windows, macOS, Linux, Unix
Sefaira	Trimble Inc.	Web

== Urban planning and environmental simulation ==
Software	Developer	Operating system
CityEngine	Esri	Windows, macOS, Linux
CommunityViz	Placeways, LLC	Windows
ENVI-met	ENVI-met GmbH	Windows, Linux
i-Tree	United States Forest Service	Windows, Web
Modelur	DEXEN	Windows, macOS
UrbanSim	UrbanSim Inc.	Windows, macOS, Linux

== See also ==
- Civil engineering
- List of civil engineering branches
- Lists of engineering software
- List of 3D modeling software and list of 3D rendering software
- List of collaborative software
- List of computer-aided engineering software
- Nemetschek
