= List of structural engineering software =

This is list of notable software packages that implement engineering analysis of structure against applied loads using structural engineering and structural engineering theory.

Name	Description
ABAQUS	Software for FEM structural analysis
ArchiCAD	BIM & 3D modeling software applied for civil & structural engineering
FEM-Design	3D Finite element analysis software for structural analysis
COMSOL Multiphysics	Simulation and multiphysics applied for structural engineering
Extreme Loading for Structures	Advanced non-linear structural analysis software
FEATool Multiphysics	Simulation and multiphysics applied for structural engineering
FEMtools	FEM software program providing advanced analysis and scripting solutions for structural engineering
FreeCAD	An open-source Swiss Army knife of general-purpose engineering toolkits
MicroStation	BIM & 3D modeling software applied for civil & structural engineering
OpenSees	Earthquake engineering software
PROKON	Structural analysis and design software
Realsoft 3D	General 3D analysis and design software
Revit	BIM & 3D modeling software applied for civil & structural engineering
RFEM	3D structural analysis & design software
SDC Verifier	Structural verification and code-checking according to different industrial standards
SimScale	Multiphysics simulation (CFD, FEA, Thermal Analysis) applied for structural and civil engineering
SketchUp	BIM & 3D modeling software applied for civil & structural engineering
SkyCiv	Cloud based 3D structural analysis & design software
STAAD	BIM & 3D structural analysis & design software for structural engineers
Tekla Structures	BIM & 3D modeling software for civil & structural engineers
SAP2000	Advanced structural analysis for more complex and non linear analysis
PLPAK	Reinforced concrete slab analysis and design & BIM structural static and dynamic analysis

== See also ==
- List of civil engineering software
- List of computer-aided engineering software
- List of BIM software
- Lists of engineering software
