= List of computer-aided engineering software =

This is a list of notable computer-aided engineering software.

Computer-Aided Engineering Software
Software	Developer	Operating System
20-sim	Controllab	Windows
Abaqus	Dassault Systèmes	Windows, Linux
ABViewer	CADSoftTools	Windows, Linux with Wine
Actran	Free Field Technologies, MSC Software	Windows, Linux
Advanced Simulation Library	ASL community	Windows, macOS, Linux, Unix
ADINA	Bentley Systems	Windows, Linux
Advanced Design System	PathWave Design	Windows, Linux, Solaris
Altair SimSolid	Altair Engineering	Windows
ANSA pre-processor	BETA CAE Systems	Windows, Linux
ANSYS	ANSYS, Inc.	Windows, Linux
ASCEND	Carnegie Mellon University	Windows, macOS, Linux
Atomistix ToolKit	Synopsys	Windows, macOS, Linux
AutoCAD	Autodesk	Windows, macOS
AutoCAST	Indian Institute of Technology Bombay	Windows, Linux
Autodesk Inventor	Autodesk	Windows
Autodesk Simulation	Autodesk	Windows, Linux
Calculix	Guido Dhondt, Klaus Wittig	Windows, Linux, macOS
CATIA	Dassault Systèmes	Windows
CONSELF	CONSELF SRL	Web application
COMSOL Multiphysics	COMSOL, Inc.	Windows, macOS, Linux
Creo Parametric	PTC	Windows
DWSIM	DWSIM community	Windows, macOS, iOS, Linux, Android
EcosimPro	ESI ITI GmbH	Windows
Elmer FEM solver	CSC – IT Center for Science	Windows, macOS, Linux
Fidelity	Cadence Design Systems	Windows, Linux
FEATool Multiphysics	Precise Simulation	Windows, macOS, Linux
Fusion	Autodesk	Windows, macOS, web browser
Gmsh	Christophe Geuzaine at University of Liège	Windows, macOS, Linux
GoldSim	GoldSim Technology Group	Windows
IRONCAD	Visionary Design Systems	Windows
Khimera	Kintech Lab	Windows, Linux
LibreCAD	Ries van Twisk	Windows, macOS, Linux, Unix-like, Haiku
MapleSim	Maplesoft	Windows, macOS, Linux
Modelica	Modelica Association Project	Windows, macOS, Linux
Moldflow	Autodesk	Windows
Nastran	MSC, NEi, Siemens	Windows, Linux, Unix
NI Multisim	National Instruments	Windows
OpenSim	Simbios	Windows, macOS, Linux
OpenFOAM	OpenFOAM Foundation	Linux
OrCAD	OrCAD Systems Corporation	Windows
PLECS	Plexim	Windows, macOS, Linux
Project Chrono	University of Parma, UW-Madison	Windows, macOS, Linux
PSF Lab	Michael J. Nasse, Jörg C. Woehl	Windows, macOS, Linux
PSIM Software	Powersim	Windows
PTC Creo	PTC	Windows
Rhinoceros 3D	TLM, Inc	Windows, macOS
RFEM	Dlubal Software	Windows
ROMeo	SimSci, Invensys, Schneider Electric, AVEVA	Windows
Salome	Open Cascade, EDF, CEA	Windows, Unix
SDC Verifier	SDC Verifier	Windows
Siemens NX	Siemens Digital Industries Software	Windows, Linux
Simcenter Amesim	Siemens Digital Industries Software	Windows, Linux
Simcenter STAR-CCM+	Siemens PLM Software	Windows, Linux
SimScale	SimScale GmbH	Web browser
SimulationX	ESI ITI GmbH	Windows
Simulink	MathWorks	Windows, macOS, Linux
Solid Edge	Siemens Digital Industries Software	Windows
SolidWorks Simulation	Dassault Systèmes	Windows
SU2 code	Stanford University, SU2 community	Windows, macOS, Linux
Tecnomatix	Siemens	Windows
TopSolid	Missler Software	Windows
TRNSYS	University of Wisconsin–Madison	Windows
VisualSim Architect	Mirabilis Design Inc	Windows, macOS, Linux

- Proprietary
- Open source
- Freeware/Trialware

== See also ==
- Computational fluid dynamics
- Finite-element analysis
- Finite element method in structural mechanics
- List of structural engineering software
- Power engineering software - software for power stations, overhead power lines, transmission towers, electrical grids, grounding, electrical substations, and Lightning
- List of computer algebra systems - Computer algebra system
- List of computer simulation software
- List of discrete event simulation software - Discrete-event simulation
- List of electrical engineering software
- List of lighting design software
- List of mechanical engineering software
- List of numerical-analysis software
- List of ray tracing software
- Lists of engineering software
- Open Source Physics - NSF projects to promote open source code libraries for physics
- Rescale - High-performance cloud computing company to run simulations and analyses offsite
- RoboLogix - Robotics simulator
- Vehicle dynamics
