= Lists of engineering software =

Lists of software used in various branches of engineering

These are lists of engineering software tools used for design, analysis, simulation, and management across different engineering disciplines.

== Lists of engineering software ==
- Accelerator physics codes
- Comparison of EDA software and list of electrical engineering software
- Comparison of electromagnetic simulation software
- Comparison of nucleic acid simulation software
- Comparison of optimization software
- Comparison of software for molecular mechanics modeling
- Comparison of system dynamics software
- List of aerospace engineering software
- List of automotive engineering software
- List of bioinformatics software and structural alignment software
- List of building information modeling software
- List of chemical engineering software
- List of chemical process simulators
- List of civil engineering software
- List of computational chemistry software and list of quantum chemistry and solid-state physics software
- List of computational fluid dynamics software
- List of computational materials science software
- List of computational physics software
- List of computer-aided engineering software
- List of computer-aided manufacturing software and list of 3D printing software
- List of construction software
- List of data science software
- List of discrete event simulation software
- List of finite element analysis software
- List of free and open-source EDA software
- List of gene prediction software
- List of genetic engineering software
- List of geotechnical engineering software
- List of GIS software
- List of HDL simulators
- List of hydrology software
- List of mechanical engineering software
- List of molecular design software
- List of numerical analysis software and list of numerical libraries
- List of open-source artificial intelligence software
- List of plasma physics software
- List of power engineering software and wind energy software
- List of programming software development tools and list of open-source libraries
- List of protein structure prediction software
- List of RNA structure prediction software
- List of robotics software
- List of scientific simulation software
- List of sequence alignment software
- List of software for nanostructures modeling
- List of software for nuclear engineering
- List of structural engineering software

== See also ==
- Comparison of 3D computer graphics software
- Comparison of CAD, CAM and CAE file viewers
- Comparison of version-control software
- Computational engineering
- Computer-aided engineering
- List of 3D modeling software and comparison of computer-aided design software
- List of CAx companies
- List of computer simulation software
- List of engineering branches
- List of engineering journals and magazines
- List of engineering software for Linux
- List of CAD file formats
- List of free and open-source software packages for engineering
- List of free electronics circuit simulators
- List of lighting design software
- List of ray tracing software
- Lists of engineers
- List of mathematical software
- List of open-source software for mathematics
- Outline of engineering
