= List of mechanical engineering software =

This is a list of mechanical engineering software used for the engineering design, analysis, simulation, and manufacturing of mechanical systems and components. Applications include computer-aided design (CAD), computer-aided engineering (CAE), finite element analysis (FEA), computational fluid dynamics (CFD), multibody simulation, and computer-aided manufacturing (CAM). Mechanical engineering software is used in industries including automotive engineering, aerospace engineering, manufacturing engineering, robotics, and building services engineering.

== Computer-aided design ==
Software	Developer	Operating system
AutoCAD	Autodesk	Windows, macOS
Autodesk Fusion	Autodesk	Windows, macOS, Web
Autodesk Inventor	Autodesk	Windows
BRL-CAD	BRL-CAD community	Windows, macOS, Linux, Unix
CATIA	Dassault Systèmes	Windows
Creo	PTC	Windows
FreeCAD	FreeCAD community	Windows, macOS, Linux
IRONCAD	IronCAD LLC	Windows
KeyCreator	Kubotek USA	Windows
Rhinoceros 3D	Robert McNeel & Associates	Windows, macOS
Siemens NX	Siemens	Windows, Linux
Solid Edge	Siemens	Windows
SolidWorks	Dassault Systèmes	Windows
SpaceClaim	ANSYS, Inc.	Windows

== Computer-aided manufacturing ==
Software	Developer	Operating system
Edgecam	Hexagon AB	Windows
Mastercam	CNC Software, LLC	Windows
PowerMILL	Autodesk	Windows

== Additive manufacturing ==
Software	Developer	Operating system
Cura	Ultimaker	Windows, macOS, Linux
PrusaSlicer	Prusa Research	Windows, macOS, Linux

== Computer-aided engineering ==
=== Finite element analysis ===
Software	Developer	Operating system
Abaqus	Dassault Systèmes	Windows, Linux
Altair HyperWorks	Altair Engineering	Windows, Linux
ANSYS	ANSYS, Inc.	Windows, Linux
Calculix	CalculiX community	Windows, Linux, macOS
COMSOL Multiphysics	COMSOL AB	Windows, macOS, Linux
Elmer FEM solver	CSC – IT Center for Science	Windows, Linux, macOS
FEniCS	FEniCS Project	Linux, macOS
LS-DYNA	ANSYS	Windows, Linux
MSC Nastran	MSC Software	Windows, Linux

=== Pre-processing and meshing ===
Software	Developer	Operating system
ANSA pre-processor	BETA CAE Systems	Windows, Linux
HyperMesh	Altair Engineering	Windows, Linux
Gmsh	Christophe Geuzaine, Jean-François Remacle	Windows, macOS, Linux
SALOME	Open CASCADE / CEA / EDF	Windows, Linux
ScanIP	Synopsys	Windows, Linux
TetGen	Hang Si	Windows, macOS, Linux

=== Computational fluid dynamics ===
Software	Developer	Operating system
OpenFOAM	OpenFOAM Foundation	Windows, Linux, macOS, Unix
Simcenter STAR-CCM+	Siemens	Windows, Linux

=== Multibody dynamics ===
Software	Developer	Operating system
MSC Adams	MSC Software	Windows, Linux

== Product lifecycle management ==
Software	Developer	Operating system
Teamcenter	Siemens	Windows, Linux
PTC Windchill	PTC	Windows, Linux

== Engineering computation and modeling ==
Software	Developer	Operating system
GNU Octave	GNU Project	Windows, macOS, Linux
Mathcad	PTC	Windows
MATLAB	MathWorks	Windows, macOS, Linux
Scilab	Dassault Systèmes	Windows, macOS, Linux
Simulink	MathWorks	Windows, macOS, Linux

== Visualization and post-processing ==
Software	Developer	Operating system
ParaView	Kitware	Windows, macOS, Linux
Tecplot	Tecplot, Inc.	Windows, macOS, Linux
VisIt	Lawrence Livermore National Laboratory	Windows, macOS, Linux

- Proprietary
- Open source

== See also ==
- Mechanical engineering
- List of 3D modeling software and list of 3D rendering software
- List of automotive engineering software
- List of computational materials science software
- Lists of engineering software
- List of mathematical software
- List of open-source mathematics software
- List of mechanical engineering journals
- List of power engineering software
- List of software for nanostructures modeling
