= Prokon =

Structural analysis software

PROKON Structural Analysis and Design
- Developer: Prokon Software Consultant (Pty) Ltd.
- Initial release: 1989
- Stable release: 5.2 / 25 April 2024
- Operating system: Windows
- Available in: English
- Type: Structural Analysis
- License: Proprietary
- Website: prokon.com

PROKON Structural Analysis and Design is a suite of commercial software for structural analysis and design. PROKON software is produced by Irish company Prokon Software Limited.

== Name ==
The Prokon company and PROKON software name is an acronym for the Afrikaans phrase "PROgrammatuur KONsultante" (programming consultants).

== Overview ==
PROKON software comprises over 40 modules in the following categories:

- Analysis: Three-dimensional frame and finite element analysis.
- Steel: Structural steel member and connection design.
- Concrete: Reinforced concrete and prestressed concrete member design.
- Composite: Composite steel and concrete member design.
- Detailing: Rebar detailing and bending schedule generation.
- Timber: Wood frame and truss design.
- Masonry: Unreinforced masonry member design.
- General: Section properties calculation and other building analysis utilities.
- Geotechnical: Slope stability and bearing capacity analysis.
- Building Information Modelling (BIM): Prodesk link between Autodesk Revit and PROKON modules.
- Network analysis: Pronet EPANET engine for AutoCAD Civil 3D.

The software includes full support for British, European and South African design codes, with some modules also supporting North American, Australian, New Zealand, Russian and selected Asian design codes. PROKON appears on the Hong Kong Building Department list of pre-accepted computer programs for use in Hong Kong.

PROKON software offers multi-lingual design output: all modules are available in English and some offer support for German, Afrikaans and Russian.

== Workflow ==
PROKON uses a workflow that output data between analysis, design and detailing modules. It supports data exchange formats with third-party software: DXF and DWG drawings, and CIS/2 CIMsteel three-dimensional structural models. The Prodesk module enables data exchange between Autodesk Revit and PROKON.

== Use ==
PROKON is used widely in South Africa and available worldwide through a partner program.

== Similar Software ==
- Staad.Pro
- S-FRAME
- SAP 2000 and ETABS
- List of structural engineering software
