= EPANET =

Water distribution system modeling software

- Original author: Lewis A. Rossman
- Developers: United States Environmental Protection Agency (USEPA, Cincinnati, Ohio)
- Stable release: 2.2 / July 23, 2020; 6 years ago
- Written in: C (engine), Object Pascal (User interface)
- Operating system: Windows
- Available in: English
- Type: Engineering Simulation
- License: None (Public domain)
- Website: www.epa.gov/water-research/epanet

EPANET (Environmental Protection Agency Network Evaluation Tool) is a public domain, water distribution system modeling software package developed by the United States Environmental Protection Agency's (EPA) Water Supply and Water Resources Division. It performs extended-period simulation of hydraulic and water-quality behavior within pressurized pipe networks and is designed to be "a research tool that improves our understanding of the movement and fate of drinking-water constituents within distribution systems". EPANET first appeared in 1993.

EPANET 2 is available both as a standalone program and as an open-source toolkit (API in C). Its computational engine is used by many software companies that developed more powerful, proprietary packages, often GIS-centric. The EPANET ".inp" input file format, which represents network topology, water consumption, and control rules, is supported by many free and commercial modeling packages. Therefore, it is arguably considered to be the industry standard.

== Features ==
EPANET provides an integrated environment for editing network input data, running hydraulic and water quality simulations, and viewing the results in a variety of formats. EPANET provides a fully equipped extended period of hydraulic analysis that can handle systems of any size. The package also supports the simulation of spatially and temporally varying water demand, constant or variable speed pumps, and the minor head losses for bends and fittings. The modeling provides information such as flows in pipes, pressures at junctions, propagation of a contaminant, chlorine concentration, water age, and even alternative scenario analysis. This helps to compute pumping energy and cost and then model various types of valves, including shutoffs, check pressure regulating and flow control.

EPANET's water quality modeling functionality allows users to analyze the movement of a reactive or non-reactive tracer material which spreads through the network over time. It tracks the reactive material as it spreads, measuring the percentage of flow from the given nodes. The package employs the global reaction rate coefficient which can be modified on a pipe-by-pipe basis. The storage tanks can be modeled as complete mix, plug flow or two-compartment reactors.

The visual network editor of EPANET simplifies the process of building piping network models and editing their properties. These various types of data reporting visualization tools are used to assist to analyze the networks, which include the graphics views, tabular views, and special reports.

== Hydraulic simulation ==
=== Headloss in pipe segments ===
The EPANET hydraulics engine computes headlosses along the pipes by using one of the three formulas:

- Hazen-Williams equation: used to model full flow conditions under simplified conditions (turbulent flow, temperature around 60 degrees Fahrenheit, and viscosity similar to water)
- Darcy-Weisbach equation: used to model pressurized flow under a broader range of hydraulic conditions
- Chezy-Manning equation: used to model pressurized flow by using Chezy's roughness coefficients for Manning's equation

Since the pipe segment headloss equation is used within the network solver, the formula above is selected for the entire model.

=== Head-flow Curves of Pumps ===
Within EPANET, pumps are modeled using a head-flow curve, which defines the relationship between hydraulic head imparted to the system by the pump and flow conveyed by the pump. The model calculates the flow conveyed by the pump element for a given system head condition based on this curve. EPANET can also model a pump as a constant power input, effectively adding a given amount of energy to the system downstream of the pump element.

=== Network solver ===
The network hydraulics solver employed by EPANET uses the "Gradient Method" first proposed by Todini and Pilati, which is a variant of Newton–Raphson method.

== Water-quality simulation ==
EPANET includes the capability to model water age and predict flow of non-reactive materials and, under simplified conditions, reactive materials. This capability is frequently used to predict chlorine residuals within water distribution systems. While the internal water quality simulation capabilities only evaluate decay or growth of a single constituent, an extension is available (EPANET-MSX), which allows modeling of interactions between constituents.

== EPANET Toolkit ==
EPANET's computational engine is available for download as a separate dynamic link library for incorporation into other applications. The source code for EPANET 2 is available on the EPA's EPANET website.

In 2012, Baseform released a rewrite of the EPANET toolkit in Java under the GNU GPLv3 license.

== Compatibility ==
EPANET uses a binary file format, but also includes the capability for importing and exporting data in DXF, metafile, and ASCII file formats. EPANET's ASCII file format is called an input file within EPANET, and uses a file extension ".inp". The input file can include data describing network topology, water consumption, and control rules, and is supported by many free and commercial modeling packages.

While EPANET is used as the computational engine for most water distribution system models, most models are developed and maintained in hydraulic modeling packages based on EPANET's computational engine. Some of the major hydraulic modeling packages are:

- AquaTwin Water, developed by Aquanuity
- InfoWorks WS Pro, InfoWater Pro, and InfoWater, by Innovyze, an AutoDesk subsidiary
- Qatium, developed by Qatium
- Fluidit Water, developed by Fluidit
- Pipe2000, developed by KYPipe, LLC
- MIKE URBAN, developed by DHI
- WaterCAD, WaterGEMS, HAMMER, and SewerCAD developed by Bentley's Haestad Methods (Hydraulics & Hydrology) group.
- WatDis, developed by Transparent Blue
- Hydronet, Calculation software for pressure networks: aqueducts, fire prevention systems, gas networks with BIM interoperability via IFC, and GIS via Shapefile developed by Newsoft
- WaterNAM, Water Network Analysis Model, developed by Streamstech Inc.
- Giswater, open source software developed by the Giswater Association
- GISpipe, software which is easily used for the analysis, design, and operation of water distribution networks Integrated with GIS system developed by Jinbosoft
- Urbano Hydra, AutoCAD/Map3D/Civil3D application software used for the hydraulic calculation, analysis, design and operation of water distribution networks. Integrated with GIS system and ready for BIM workflows developed by StudioARS Company
- GeoSan, open source GIS software to manage water pipes and consumers, developed by NEXUS GeoEngenharia available at www.softwarepublico.gov.br.
- WateNET-CAD, developed by Diolkos3D.
- Esurvey Water, developed by https://www.esurveying.net. The output Files from EPANET can be used to generate LS and presentable Final Drawings

Most of these applications allow for multiple demand conditions, planning scenarios, and various methods of integrating with other data sources an agency may already have in place not supported in EPANET, such as GIS, and support additional types of analyses not found in EPANET. ESurvey Water is developed to create Auto Designed Longitudinal Profiles, and auto generation of the final outputs after the hydraulic design is completed in EPANET and other software.

== See also ==
- Hydraulics
- Pipe network analysis
- Storm Water Management Model
- Public domain software
- Water supply network
