= HEC-RAS =

Software for simulating water flow within rivers

1D HEC-RAS model, showing river line and cross-sections. Each cross-section is depth-averaged.

HEC-RAS (short for Hydrologic Engineering Center River Analysis System) is a simulation software used to model the hydraulics of water flow through natural rivers and other open channels. The program was developed by the United States Army Corps of Engineers (USACE) at the Hydrologic Engineering Center (HEC) in Davis, California as a successor to their HEC-2 Water Surface Profiles program. HEC-RAS version 1.0 was released in July 1995, with the capability to model steady flow in one dimension; since then, further releases have increased the modeling capabilities to include quasi-unsteady and unsteady flow, two dimensional modeling, sediment transport and water quality modeling, and distributed hydrologic modeling (Rain-on-Grid.) The program is free to download from HEC, though there is no support provided for non-USACE users.

Though HEC-RAS was initially developed by USACE for use on their own projects, other United States federal agencies have adopted it for use, including FEMA. It is also used by hydraulic modelers for various applications worldwide, both in academia and industry.

== Program history ==
In 1964, Bill S. Eichert, working at HEC for USACE, developed a step-backwater program. Eventually released as "Backwater Any Cross Section" in FORTRAN in 1966, this would be the first of many iterations of HEC-2, designed to model flow in open channels in one dimension.

The first version of HEC-RAS was released in July of 1995. Though one-dimensional HEC-RAS solves the same equations as HEC-2, the computational routines and numerical methods are completely different.

HEC-RAS 1.0 - 4.1 focused on improving one-dimensional modeling capabilities. In 2016, HEC released HEC-RAS Version 5.0, which included two-dimensional modeling capabilities. Version 6.0, released in May 2021, including distributed hydraulic modeling (Rain-on-Grid), as well as sediment transport and water quality modeling capabilities.

In the fall of 2024, HEC announced they were in the process of developing the next generation of HEC-RAS, which they compared to the transition from HEC-2 to HEC-RAS. Intended to streamline and update the existing software, HEC-RAS 2025 will feature a new, modern user interface, new meshing methods, and an explicit solver. The transition between an alpha version of HEC-RAS 2025 and an industry-ready version is expected to last several years.

== Capabilities ==
As of the HEC-RAS 6.6 release, HEC-RAS seeks to support four major capabilities: 1D steady flow modeling; 1D or 2D unsteady flow modeling; sediment transport modeling; and 1D water-quality modeling. The major HEC-RAS features are discussed in more detail below.

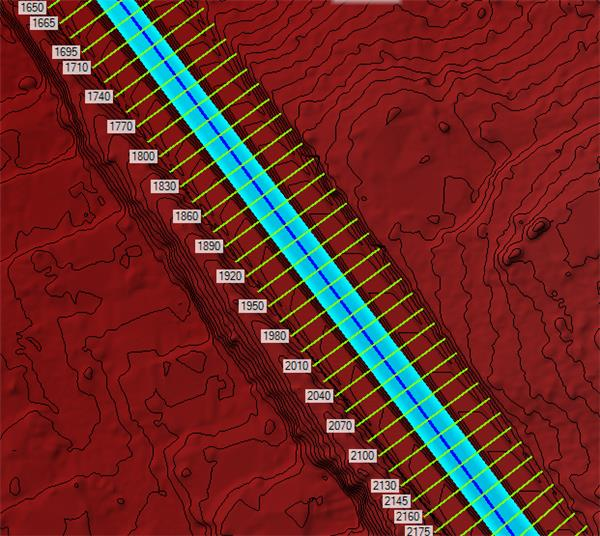
A 1D HEC-RAS model of a flood control channel, with auto-generated cross-sections.

=== 1D Modeling ===
When modeling in 1D HEC-RAS, users define a river line along the thalweg of the primary watercourse and specify cross-sections across the channel, either by use of terrain data (such as LiDAR) or with exact elevations. Additional information, including peak discharge, Manning’s n of the channel, and specification of boundary conditions, is necessary for the model to run. HEC-RAS solves the one-dimensional Saint-Venant equations, a simplification of the Navier-Stokes equations, resulting in cross-sectionally averaged results. Various capabilities in the software allow for the modeling of bridges, culverts, levees, obstructions, ice impacts, and debris build-up.

Though many industry users and regulatory interests are moving towards 2D analysis as standard, some applications still favor 1D analysis. These scenarios include very large river systems, or rivers with many structures (e.g., bridges and culverts), where flow is contained and primarily in a single direction. In these cases, a two dimensional model may take an unrealistic amount of time to run compared to the much less computationally complex one dimensional model.

=== 2D Modeling ===
When modeling in 2D HEC-RAS, users define a mesh across their terrain data. Though the mesh is nominally rectangular, refinement tools such as breaklines allow the mesh to be composed of various nesting polygons of up to eight faces. Boundary conditions are used to allow flow to enter and leave the model. Inflow boundary conditions can utilize hydrographs or stage data, amongst other methods, while outflow boundary condition options include rating curve, normal depth, stage hydrograph, and flow hydrograph.

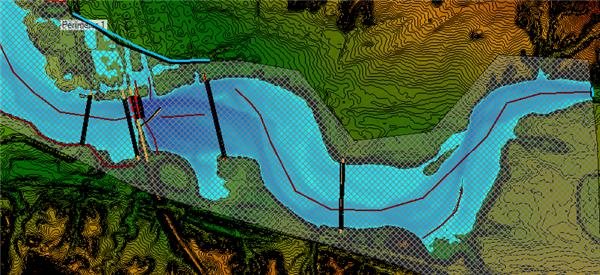
A 2D HEC-RAS model, with a flow hydrograph as an upstream boundary condition, models flow through a river floodplain before contracting at a bridge and the embankment.

2D HEC-RAS solve can various forms of the depth-averaged Saint-Venant Equations, and allows the user to choose which equation set to utilize for modeling. The Diffusion Wave equation set drops the unsteady, advection, turbulence and Coriolis terms of the Saint-Venant equations, and increase computational efficiency for simple models. However, in certain situations (including modeling structures, highly dynamic flows, or superelevation), the more robust Shallow Water Equations (SWE) are recommended, though this tends to increase computation times. When using SWE, the user can also chose to model turbulence, using either a conservative or non-conservative formulation.

The 2D solver uses an implicit finite volume solution algorithm, and as of the 6.6 release, does not support GPU computing.

Though 2D models are generally more accurate than 1D, especially for modeling complex floodplains and unconfined flow, they also are reliant on the assumption that flow varies significantly more horizontally than it does vertically. In situations that violate this assumption, such as vertical drops, complex structure hydraulics, or river bends, 2D models such as HEC-RAS may fail to accurately model fluid flow. In order to model these scenarios, CFD solvers such as OpenFOAM or Flow-3D Hydro, amongst others may be more appropriate choices.

=== Distributed Modeling ===
Since HEC-RAS 6.0, the software has had the capability to distributively hydraulic model utilizing the Rain-on-Grid feature. Utilizing provided rainfall data and an infiltration layer along with the terrain data, the software will simulate rainfall, losses, and runoff over the entire model area, rather than relying on inflows dictated at a boundary condition. Three loss methods are currently supported: NRCS Curve Number, Green & Ampt, and Deficit and Constant.

While distributed modeling has many advantages, including providing a better understanding of highly complex flow paths, longer runtimes and limitations of available loss methods in HEC-RAS are drawbacks. Additionally, high resolution terrain data (typically better than 10 meter) is essential when developing a distributed hydraulic model.

=== Sediment Transport Modeling ===
HEC-RAS is capable of modeling sediment either in 1D or, since 6.0, in 2D. Options are also available for modeling Non-Newtonian fluids, such as debris flows. The 1D sediment approach is based on HEC 6 and HEC 6T, which were developed by Tony Thomas for USACE. Sediment continuity is modeled using the Exner equation, which HEC-RAS solves by computing a sediment transport capacity. Based on a comparison of capacity to sediment supply, a volume of sediment is either eroded or deposited. Sediment data is entered as gradations, which the model then converts into volumes. Based on the results of the sediment transport model, the bed can either aggrade or degrade.

In 1D, the quasi-unsteady flow function simulates a hydrograph using a series of steady flow calculations, and is typically used to model sediment in an existing 1D model. As of 5.0, sediment transport is supported in 1D unsteady flow modeling. Eight sediment transport functions are included in 1D, utilized to model sediment transport potential. Theses include Ackers and White, England and Hansen, Laursen-Copeland, Meyer-Peter and Müller (MPM), Toffaleti, MPM-Toffaleti, Yang, and Wilcock and Crowe. Selection of a sediment transport function depends on the bed material of the modeled reach.

In 2D, the sediment transport model is added to an existing 2D hydraulics model. The complex nature of sediment transport requires the use of the shallow water equation se. The conservative turbulence model was specifically developed for sediment transport applications. In addition to the sediment transport functions available in 1D, 2D also supports Soulsby-van Rijn, Van Rijn, and Wu et al.

== Applications & Users ==
HEC-RAS is widely used in both academic and industry applications, as well as by USACE for official applications. HEC-RAS is approved by FEMA for use in floodplain mapping in the United States, and is widely used in modern floodplain studies. Outside of hydraulic engineering applications such as modeling culverts, bridges, levees, and floodplains, HEC-RAS has been utilized to model lava flows, dam breaches, debris flows, glacial lake outburst floods, and coupled with water quality tools to model pollutants two-dimensionally.

Extension softwares developed for use by civil engineers, such as GeoHEC-RAS and WMS, provide additional visualization and data processing capabilities to HEC-RAS users.

HEC-RAS is free to download from USACE, and is supported on Windows 10/11 64-bit operating systems, as well as Linux systems.

== See also ==
- HEC-HMS
