= Engineering analysis =

Engineering analysis involves the application of scientific/mathematical analytic principles and processes to reveal the properties and state of a system, device or mechanism under study.

Engineering analysis is decompositional: it proceeds by separating the engineering design into the mechanisms of operation or failure, analyzing or estimating each component of the operation or failure mechanism in isolation, and re-combining the components according to basic physical principles and natural laws.

== Applied/engineering mathematical analysis ==
Engineering analysis and applied analysis are synonym terms for mathematical analysis/calculus beyond basic differential equations such as applied for various advanced physics & engineering topics (including Fourier analysis, Lagrangian & Hamiltonian mechanics, Laplace transforms, Sturm–Liouville theory, and others) but still can involve mathematical proofs.

== Remote systems ==
Engineering analysis is the primary method for predicting and handling issues with remote systems such as satellites and rovers. Engineering analysis for remote systems must be ongoing since the health and safety of the remote system can only be affected remotely (and because any failure could have fatal consequences).

The capabilities of engineering analysis therefore must incorporate trending as well as analysis. Trending should be proactive, predictive, comprehensive and automated. Analysis must be reactive, investigative, targeted and hands-on. Together trending and analysis allow operators to both predict potential situations and identify anomalous events that threaten a remote system.

== See also ==
- Calculus
- Differential equations
- Fourier analysis
- List of computer-aided engineering software
- Mathematical analysis
- Multivariable Calculus
- Pinch analysis
- Structural analysis
