= Plaxis =

Geotechnical software

PLAXIS

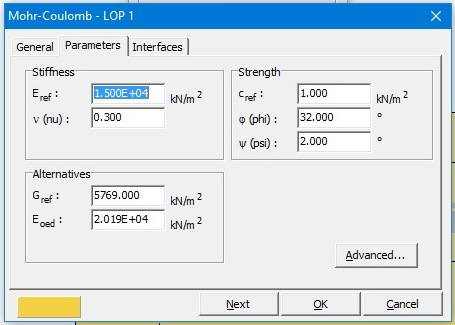
- Input parameters given for the Mohr–Coulomb soil model
- Developer: Bentley Systems
- Release: 1987; 39 years ago
- Stable release: 2024.2
- Operating system: Windows
- Available in: English, Chinese, Japanese
- Type: Computer-aided design, Finite Element Analysis
- License: Floating licensing
- Website: bentley.com/en/products/brands/plaxis

Plaxis (sometimes stylised in all caps; a contraction of PLasticity and AXIalSymmetry, is a computer program, originally written by René de Borst as part of his MSc thesis, that performs finite element analyses (FEA) within the realm of geotechnical engineering, including deformation, stability and water flow. The input procedures enable the enhanced output facilities provide a detailed presentation of computational results. PLAXIS enables new users to work with the package after only a few hours of training.

Plaxis BV was acquired by the American Bentley Systems, Inc. in 2018.
