= PLPAK =

The PLPAK developers, BE4E, describe it as "The PLPAK is special purpose software package for structural analysis of building slabs and foundations based on the Boundary Element Method". The PLPAK uses the shear-deformable plate bending theory according to Reissner.

== Technical publications ==
This package is developed by Prof. Youssef F. Rashed with his research group. The following are some relevant publications:

1. Rashed, Y. F., Boundary Element Formulations for Thick Plates, Topics in engineering, Vol. 35. WIT press, Southampton and Boston, (2000).
2. Rashed, Y. F., C.A. Brebbia, Eds., Transformation of domain effects to the boundary, WIT press, Southampton and Boston, (2003).
3. Rashed, Y. F., Aliabadi, M.H., Brebbia, C.A., Transformation of domain integrals in BEM for thick foundation plates. ASCE J. Engineering Mechanics, 125(9), 1062-1070 (1999).
4. Rashed, Y. F., Aliabadi, M.H., Boundary element analysis of building foundation plates. Engineering Analysis with Boundary Element, 24, 201–206, (2000).
5. Rashed, Y. F. A boundary integral transformation for bending analysis of thick plates resting on bi-parameter foundation. Advances in Structural Engineering, 5(1), 13-22, (2002).
6. Rashed, Y. F., A coupled BEM-flexibility force method for bending analysis of internally supported plates. Int. J. Numerical Methods in Engineering, 54, 1431–1457, (2002).
7. Rashed, Y. F., BEM for dynamic analysis using compact supported radial basis functions, Computers & Structures, 80, 1351–1367, (2002).
8. Rashed, Y. F., Boundary element modelling of flat plate floors under vertical loading, Int. J. Numerical Methods in Engineering, 62, 1606–1635, (2005).
9. Rashed, Y. F., A boundary/domain element method for analysis of building raft foundations, Engineering Analysis with Boundary Elements, 29, 859-877, (2005).
10. Rashed, Y. F., A relative quantity integral equation formulation for evaluation of boundary stress resultants in shear deformable plate bending problems, Eng. Analysis with Boundary Elements 32, 152–161, (2008).

== Applications ==
The PLPAK can be used to do structural analysis for:

- Building reinforced slabs.
- Building post-tensioned slabs.
- Building rafts, including rafts on piles.

== Modelling capabilities ==
The analysis using the PLPAK allows the modeler to make use of the advantages of the boundary element modeling. The PLPAK user has the ability to:

1. Accurate modeling of problem geometry including geometry of different structural elements (beams, prestressing cables etc....) and fine details.
2. Ability to model the area connection between the plate and other structural elements.
3. The ability to get highly accurate local results in different forms that would be required in design e.g. strips and local contours.
4. Results can be displayed in different forms e.g. bending moment, twisting moment, highly accurate shear results and displacements. Moreover, the PLPAK provides the user with the design moment based on Wood and Armur equation that includes the effect of torsion moment.
5. Easy input of structural model using DXF import.
6. Ability to do multiple update of the post-tensioning cables to the model during the design process.
7. Small disk space, even huge models are mailable.
8. The PLPAK can provide the user with soil reaction map in foundation problems.

== Software components ==
The PLPAK software is an integrated development environment helps the user to generate his model using the PLGen module. It allows the user to view or/and edit the used boundary element model via the PLView module. Hence he can solve it using the PLCoreMan module. The PLPost module serves as a post-processing module for the obtained results. The package could be linked to other packages such as the PTPAK which provide the capability of adding post-tensioned cables to the model. The proposed PLPAK package consists mainly of five main parts (separate modules) as follows:

1. The BE model generator (the PLGen module).
2. The BE model viewer (the PLView module).
3. The core solver module (the PLCoreMan module).
4. The post-processor (the PLPost module).
5. The post-tension module (PTPAK).

=== The PLGen module ===
The PLGen module stands for the virtual model generator or the pre-processor of the PLPAK. It mainly changes any structural drawing to what is called the "virtual model". Modeller can import structural drawings from DXF CAD files or can draw then directly using the CAD capabilities of the PLGen. The virtual model looks very similar to the original structural drawing. The PLGen mainly define the structure using series of objects. These objects are classified into one of three categories: the geometrical objects (single slab and openings), the loading objects (column load, wall load, load patch, load assembly) and the supporting objects (column, wall, wall assembly, soil support, beam). Using such objects the modeler can define all elements in the building slab. The virtual model represents the actual slab shape (not like the centre-line model of the finite element method). Columns and walls are represented by the actual cross section shape. The PLGen can also input the numerical models of each object such as the number of boundary elements for each segments, the discretization of the beam-slab contact areas, etc. Load cases only (i.e. no load combinations) are defined in the PLGen module. Material properties are also defined herein. The below Figure demonstrates the graphical user interface of the PLGen module.

The following table states the types of objects available in the PLGEn module.

Structural Object	Typical modeling usages
Slab	Modeling building slabs and foundations
Opening	Add openings to the slab object
Column/Pile	Modeling supports of mean dimensions like most of structural columns supporting Building slabs or Piles supporting foundations
Beam	Modeling of beams supporting the slabs
Wall Support	Modeling supports elongated in one direction like a buildings shear walls
Support Assembly	Modeling supports of complex geometry like buildings cores or broken shear walls
Load Patches	Add a distributed load over a quadrilateral part of the slab object
Column Load	Add vertical force and two moments over a quadrilateral part of the slab object
Wall Load	Modeling Loads elongated in one direction like a buildings shear walls loads over a raft foundation and loads over slabs due to brick walls
Load Assembly	Modeling Loads of complex geometry like buildings cores loads over a raft foundation
Soil Support	Modeling the soil supporting the building foundation

The capabilities of this module can be summarized as follows:

1. Construct a virtual structural model for the problem using object-based modeling. This is proposed to be done through an interactive graphical interface that can construct and edit the virtual model.
2. Generate a BE model from the virtual model.
3. Control the generated BE model through the graphical interface using parameters settings.
4. Import CAD drawings to facilitate the construction of the virtual model.
5. Store the virtual model in a binary form so that it can be recalled later.
6. Undo and redo changes made to the virtual model.
7. Construct a 3D view of the virtual structural model.
8. Handling different load cases and generating a BE model for each one.

=== The PLView module ===
The PLView module is a MDI (multiple document interface) graphical environment that allows the modeller to view or/and to edit the boundary element numerical model of the considered problem. Boundary element discretization and internal loading or supporting patches are viewed. The PLView could be launched directly from the PLGen module. Practical engineers or beginners can skip this module. The expert modellers can write their own input text file for the considered numerical model and input it directly to the PLView model without passing through the PLGen module. The below Figure demonstrates the graphical user interface of the PLView module.

This is the BE model viewer that is developed to visualize the generated boundary element models generated by the PLGen module or from user text input. This module has also some model editing capabilities that are considered a secondary benefit. Only advanced users who have thorough understanding of boundary element modeling can make use of this feature. The core component of this module is proposed to be a dataset that contains data tables of all the entities forming the model. This dataset can be thought of as a database that resides in the computer memory rather than on the computer hard disk. This technique is usually faster for data centric applications especially when the size of data is not large, as the case when using BEM. The dataset is populated using the data that already exist in the input text file (*.in) and then the populated dataset is used to visualize the model. The model data typically consist of material parameters, linear equation solver parameters, nodes coordinates, points coordinates, elements connectivity data, columns definition, cells definition and internal points coordinates.

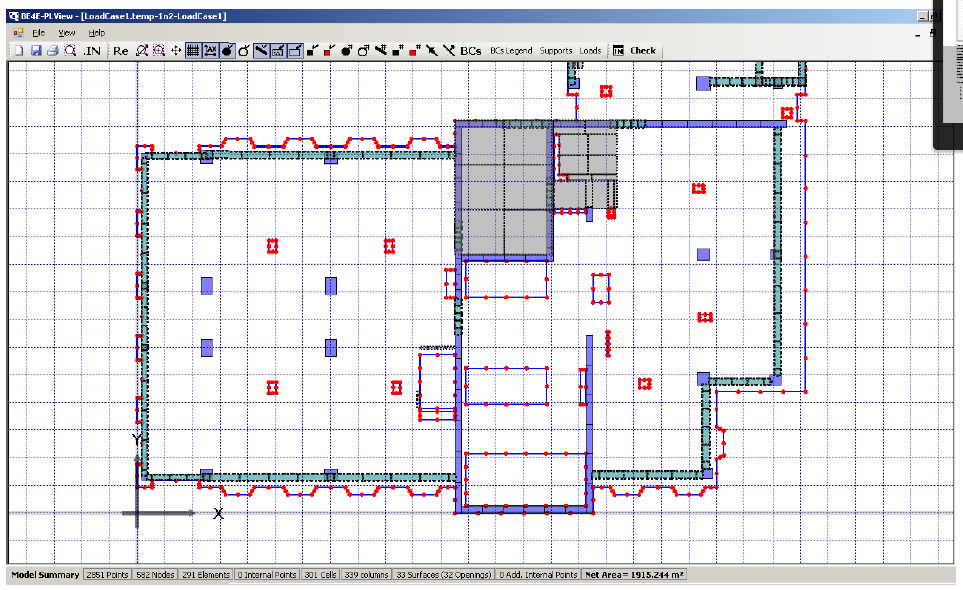

The capabilities of the BE model viewer can be summarized in the following:

1. Display all the model data graphically.
2. Display all the model data in tabular form.
3. Edit the model data in the tables.
4. Store the model again in text format after editing.

=== The PLCoreMan module ===
The PLCoreMan module serves as a link between all of the PLPAK modules. It allows solution for multiple load cases. It also allows adding any additional loading (such as pre-stressing loading) or sophisticated supporting elements (such as any substructure). It also acts as solution tracer.

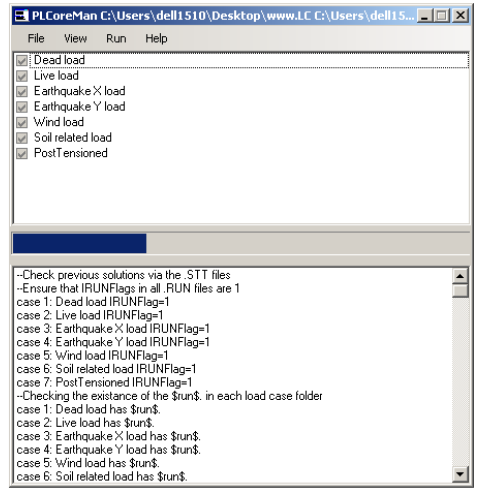

This is the part of the PLPAK that is responsible for solving the boundary element model (saved by the PLGen) using Reissner plate bending equations. The main part of the module is the PL.exe which is the core solver. This module allows the user to add post tensioning cables and updates the input files according to the cables added. The below Figure demonstrates the generic operation diagram for the PL.exe core solver.

=== The PLPost module ===
The PLPost module allows the user to display the results in forms of strips, contours, and colour patches. All results obtained in the PLPost environment are computed using analytical integral equations. In other words, no approximation is involved. Load combinations are defined herein. Results of any form could be exported easily to text files or to spreadsheets programs. The below Figure demonstrates the graphical user interface of the PLPost module.

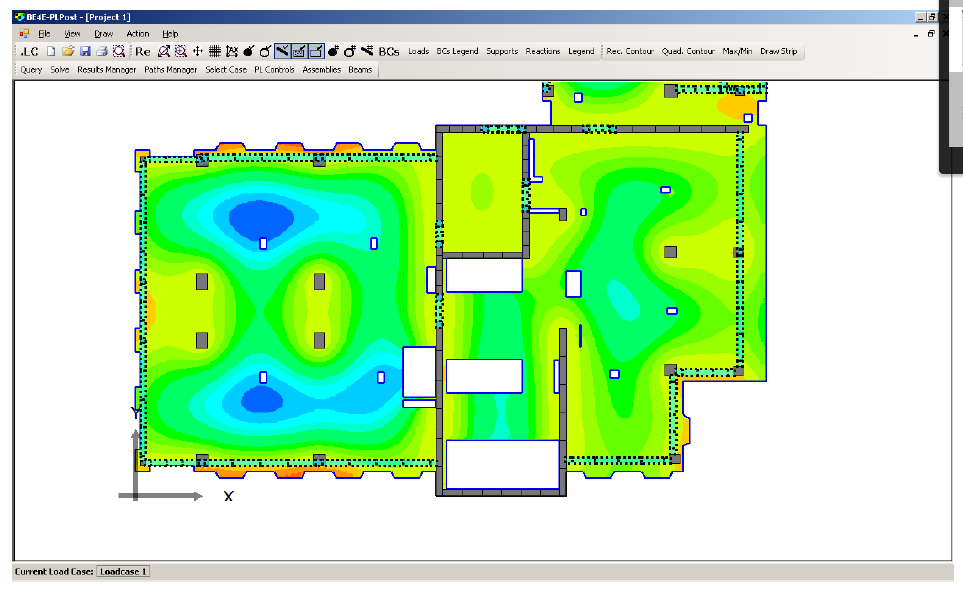

The proposed capabilities of the post processor can be summarized in the following:

1. Represent the results at a point.
2. Represent the results along a line.
3. Represent the results over an area using contour plots.
4. Export the results in formatted text files.
5. Store the results in a binary form, so that it can be recalled without repeating the analysis.
6. Perform the load combinations of different load cases.
7. Display the columns reactions or soil contact pressures under the raft graphically.

=== The PTPAK module ===
The PTPAK is the software component responsible for the creation of cable profiles and updating them to the structural model.
