= S-FRAME Software =

Canadian engineering company

- Industry: Analysis and design software for structural engineers
- Founded: 1981
- Key people: Marinos Stylianou (CEO), George Casoli (Founder, President)
- Website: http://www.s-frame.com

S-FRAME Software Inc., (now part of Altair) formerly SOFTEK Services Ltd. is a Canadian engineering software company that develops analysis and design software for use by civil and structural engineers. S-FRAME was founded in 1981 by George Casoli, FCSCE, P.Eng. The company was acquired in 2021 by Altair Engineering.

S-FRAME is on the list of accepted computer programs for use in Hong Kong from the Hong Kong Building Department.

== Use in notable structures ==
S-FRAME Analysis and S-CONCRETE were used to create structural models of the Burj Khalifa, currently, the world's tallest building, designed by Chicago, Illinois-based Skidmore, Owings & Merrill LLP (SOM). Bill Baker, Partner at SOM, discussed the use of S-FRAME in his keynote at the 2012 Structural Engineers Association of British Columbia (SEABC) Annual General Meeting, stating that SOM used S-FRAME as it was the program with which their in-house optimization software integrated.

== Product list ==
S-FRAME Structural Office consists of:

1. S-FRAME - structural modeling, analysis, and design with links to BIM software.
2. S-STEEL - design and optimization of 2D/3D steel structures.
3. S-CALC - cross-sectional properties calculator.
4. S-TIMBER - structural analysis and timber design.
5. S-PAD - design and optimization of steel members.
6. S-CONCRETE - section design and detailing tool for reinforced concrete beams, columns and walls.
7. S-LINE - design and detailing of continuous reinforced concrete beams.
8. S-FOUNDATION - analysis and design of reinforced concrete footings and foundations.
9. S-VIEW - post-processing tool for model validation and collaboration.
