= HEC-HMS =

Hydrology software of the U.S. Army Corps of Engineers

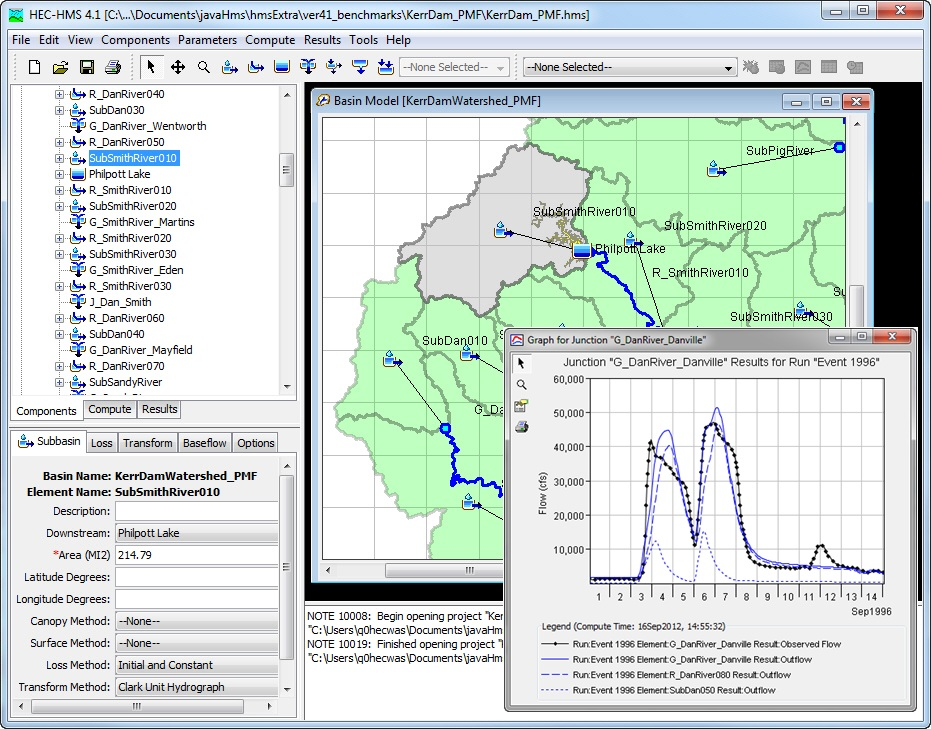
A screenshot from the HEC-HMS application open.

The HEC-HMS (Hydrologic Engineering Center - Hydrologic Modeling System) is a hydrology software of the U.S. Army Corps of Engineers.

It is designed to simulate the precipitation-runoff processes of dendritic drainage basins. It is designed to be applicable in a wide range of geographic areas for solving the widest possible range of problems. This includes large river basin water supply and flood hydrology, and small urban or natural watershed runoff. Hydrographs produced by the program are used directly or in conjunction with other software for studies of water availability, urban drainage, flow forecasting, future urbanization impact, reservoir spillway design, flood damage reduction, floodplain regulation, and systems operation.

The program is a generalized modeling system capable of representing many different watersheds. A model of the watershed is constructed by separating the water cycle into manageable pieces and constructing boundaries around the watershed of interest. Any mass or energy flux in the cycle can then be represented with a mathematical model. In most cases, several model choices are available for representing each flux. Each mathematical model included in the program is suitable in different environments and under different conditions. Making the correct choice requires knowledge of the watershed, the goals of the hydrologic study, and engineering judgement.

HEC-HMS was developed beginning in 1992 as a replacement for HEC-1 which has long been considered a standard for hydrologic simulation. It was written in the FORTRAN language and until 1984 could only be run on a mainframe computer. When desktop computers became popular the program was ported to the PC.

The new HEC-HMS provides almost all of the same simulation capabilities, but has modernized them with advances in numerical analysis that take advantage of the significantly faster desktop computers available today. It also includes a number of features that were not included in HEC-1, such as continuous simulation and grid cell surface hydrology. It also provides a graphical user interface to make it easier to use the software. The program is now widely used and accepted for many official purposes, such as floodway determinations for the Federal Emergency Management Agency in the United States.

== See also ==
- HEC-RAS
