= SVSlope =

Geotechnical engineering software

SVSLOPE
- Developer(s): SoilVision Systems Ltd.
- Operating system: Microsoft Windows
- Available in: English
- Type: slope stability software
- License: Proprietary

SVSLOPE is a slope stability analysis program developed by SoilVision Systems Ltd.. The software is designed to analyze slopes using both the classic "method of slices" as well as newer stress-based methods. The program is used in the field of civil engineering to analyze levees, earth dams, natural slopes, tailings dams, heap leach piles, waste rock piles, and anywhere there is concern for mass wasting. SVSLOPE finds the factor of safety or the probability of failure for the slope. The software makes use of advanced searching methods to determine the critical failure surface.

== Methodology ==
Slope stability problems in geotechnical and geo-environmental engineering involve the solution of equilibrium equations of force and moment. This is traditionally accomplished through traditional method of slices techniques or more progressive stress-based methods. SVSLOPE implements a wide variety of both limit equilibrium methods as well as newer stress-based methods. The classic Bishops, Sarma, Ordinary, Spencers, Morgenstern-Price, GLE, and US Army Corps of Engineers methods are implemented.

The method of slices involves calculating the forces at the base of each slice by the weight of the slice and its height. The newer stress-based techniques use the finite element method in order to calculate more detailed information related to the stresses in the slope. With the finite element-based approach it is possible to represent more complex stress conditions in the slope. The SVSOLID software may be used in order to calculate the finite element stresses in a particular slope.

The user enters geometry, material properties, and analysis constraints (such as searching methodologies) through a CAD-type graphical user interface (GUI). The results may also be viewed in the context of a graphical user interface. The geometry is simply entered as regions which may be drawn, pasted in from Excel, or imported from AutoCAD DXF files. The factor of safety for a specific failure surface is computed as the forces driving failure along the surface divided by the shear resistance of the soils along the surface.

SVSLOPE implements a number of different searching algorithms to identify the critical slip surface. Algorithms for determining both circular and non-circular critical slip surfaces are implemented. Specified slip surfaces can also be employed.

A library of slope stability benchmark models are distributed with the software.

== Features ==
The developers of SVSLOPE have implemented all of the classic features traditionally found in slope stability software as well as an interesting list of new features.

The following is a list of some of the more distinct features of SVSLOPE:

- Probabilistic analysis
- One-way or two-way sensitivity analysis
- Spatial variability using random fields
- Comprehensive searching algorithms for circular and non-circular slip surfaces
- Unsaturated analysis (coupling with SVFLUX and unsaturated shear strength material properties)
- New finite element based slope stability methods
- Distributed with over 100 example models

Classic features also supported by the software include:

- Distributed loads
- Point loads
- Soil reinforcement
- A variety of ways to represent pore-water pressures
- Non-circular slip surfaces
- Help system and tutorial manual
- Representation of tension cracks
- 17 different soil strength models
