= Etap =

Etap or ETAP may refer to:

== Organizations ==
- École des troupes aéroportées, a training school for paratroops in Pau, France
- École Technique de Photographie et d’Audiovisuel, university in Toulouse
- Entreprise Tunisienne d'Activités Pétrolières, a state-owned petroleum company in Tunisia
- Etap Hotel, now renamed Ibis Budget
- ETAP Lighting, a Belgian lighting manufacturer
- ETAP Yachting, a Belgian boatbuilder

== Other uses ==
- Etap, Warsaw, a neighbourhood in Warsaw, Poland
- Electrical Transient Analyzer Program
- Eastern Trough Area Project
- Exercise-related transient abdominal pain, also known as a side stitch
