= CONSELF =

Computer-aided engineering platform

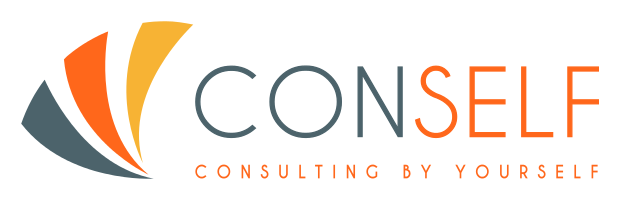

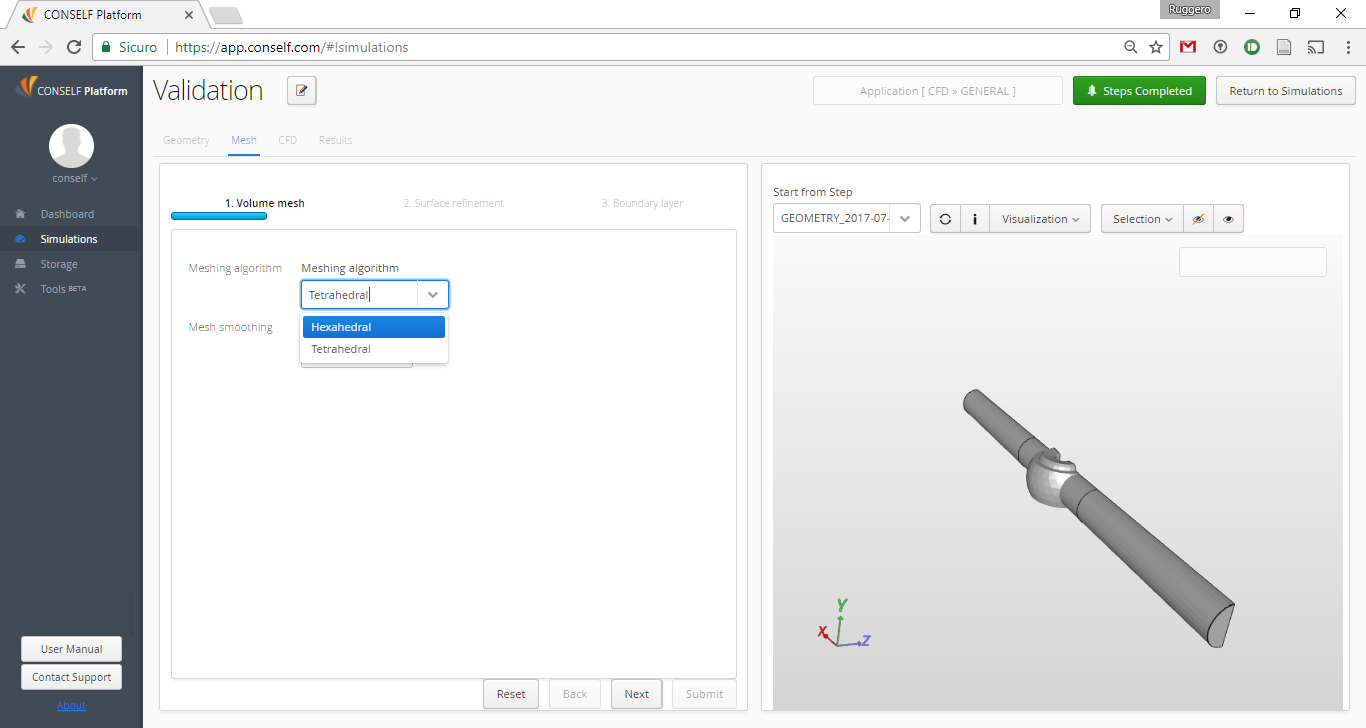
- Developer(s): CONSELF SRL
- Initial release: 2015; 10 years ago
- Platform: Web browser
- Type: Computer-aided engineering
- Website: conself.com

CONSELF is a computer-aided engineering (CAE) platform used by engineers for design purposes. The platform, which highly relies on cloud computing, is developed by CONSELF SRL since its first release in October 2015. In March 2016 a new release of the platform defined guided workflows for the users with focus on turbomachinery, fire scenarios and flows with dispersed solid particles. Through the platform it is possible to run both Computational Fluid Dynamics and Finite Element Analysis. Among the solvers and libraries used by CONSELF platform, a number of open-source technologies are included, such as:

- FEA: Code_Aster
- CFD: OpenFOAM

The accuracy of the application is guaranteed by a close cooperation with Italian universities and production of academic papers and research studies. Because of its level of innovation and thanks to the high number of industrial applications, the platform has been rewarded in Italy by national industrial association CONFINDUSTRIA.

== Features ==
The simulation platform is currently capable of running both CFD and FEA simulations, using hardware resources provided on a pay-per-use basis. Going into the details of the simulation capabilities and, considering the two major operative fields, CONSELF gives the following features:

- Mesh generation
  - Tetrahedral and hexahedral meshing algorithms
  - Boundary layer definition for CFD analysis
- Finite Element Analysis solvers
  - Single body simulation
  - Static analysis
  - Modal analysis
  - Isotropic linear elastic material model
  - Geometrical non-linear behaviour (large-displacements)
- Computational Fluid Dynamics solvers
  - Incompressible/Compressible single material flow
  - Multiphase non compressible flows
  - Passive scalar transport for HVAC
  - Single Reference Frame (SRF) simulation for Turbomachinery
  - Flow with particles

== File format ==
CONSELF is currently able to interact with a number of 3D modelling generated file formats such as: STEP, IGES, STL formats. In addition, the geometry can be directly imported from their partner CAD platform, namely Onshape. As output files CONSELF is 100% compatible with opensource viewer ParaView.
