= MATSim =

Agent-based simulation

MATSim (the Multi-Agent Transport Simulation Toolkit) is an open source software development project developing agent-based software modules intended for use with transportation planning models.

== History ==
"The MATSim project started with Kai Nagel, then at ETH Zurich, and his interest in improving his work with, and for, the TRansportation ANalysis and SIMulation System (TRANSIMS) project; he also wanted to make the resulting code open-source. After Kai Nagel’s departure to TU Berlin in 2004, Kay Axhausen joined the team, bringing a different approach and experience."

== Areas of Application ==
MATSim has been applied to various areas: road transport, public transport, freight transport, regional evacuation etc.
