= Engineering Analysis with Boundary Elements =

Scientific journal

- Discipline: Numerical analysis, engineering
- Language: English
- Edited by: Alexander H.-D. Cheng

Publication details
- History: 1989—present
- Publisher: Elsevier
- Frequency: Monthly
- Impact factor: 4.1 (2024)

Standard abbreviations
- ISO 4: Eng. Anal. Bound. Elem.

Indexing
- ISSN: 0955-7997 (print); 1873-197X (web)

Links
- Journal homepage; Online access; Online archive

Engineering Analysis with Boundary Elements is a peer-reviewed scientific journal published monthly by Elsevier. Established in 1989, it covers research on the application of boundary element method to engineering problems, as well as studies on related numerical analysis techniques such as meshfree methods. Its current editor-in-chief is Alexander H.-D. Cheng (University of Mississippi).

== Abstracting and indexing ==
The journal is abstracted and indexed in:

- Current Contents/Engineering, Computing & Technology
- EBSCO databases
- Ei Compendex
- Inspec
- MathSciNet
- Science Citation Index Expanded
- Scopus
- zbMATH Open

According to the Journal Citation Reports, the journal has a 2024 impact factor of 4.1.
