= ANSA pre-processor =

Computer-aided engineering tool

ANSA is a computer-aided engineering tool for finite element analysis and computational fluid dynamics analysis widely used in the automotive industry. It is developed by BETA CAE Systems. The software is distributed worldwide by a number of BETA CAE Systems subsidiaries and business agents. In the United States, it is distributed by Beta CAE Systems, USA, based in Farmington Hills, Michigan.

ANSA maintains the association between computer-aided engineering geometry and the finite element mesh. This means that the finite element meshes are better representations of their geometric parents. Also it is easy to maintain and update any changes in the geometry by simply reworking the updated area instead of recreating the finite element from scratch.

It carries several proprietary algorithms for meshing suitable for both CFD and structural models. ANSA initially stood for 'automatic net generation for structural analysis', but the software has gone beyond that very quickly.
