= OpenSees =

Software framework

- Written in: C++
- Operating system: Linux, Windows and Unix-like
- License: http://opensees.berkeley.edu/OpenSees/copyright.php
- Website: opensees.berkeley.edu
- Repository: github.com/OpenSees/OpenSees/

OpenSees (the Open System for Earthquake Engineering Simulation) is an object-oriented software framework created during the National Science Foundation-sponsored era (1997-2007) of the Pacific Earthquake Engineering Research (PEER) Center. OpenSees allows users to create finite element applications for simulating the response of structural and geotechnical systems subjected to earthquakes. This framework was developed by Frank McKenna and Gregory L. Fenves with significant contributions from Michael H. Scott, Terje Haukaas, Armen Der Kiureghian, Remo de Souza, Filip C. Filippou, Silvia Mazzoni, and Boris Jeremic. OpenSees is primarily written in C++ and uses several Fortran numerical libraries for linear equation solving.

== Licensing ==
The license permits the use, reproduction, modification, and distribution by educational, research, and non-profit entities for non-commercial purposes. Use, reproduction, and modification by other entities is allowed for internal purposes, but these entities cannot redistribute the program or its derivatives.

== Usage ==
Users of OpenSees create applications by writing scripts in either the Tcl or Python programming language.

OpenSees developers manage the source code at GitHub.

Finite element model of an overpass bridge modeled with OpenSees and rendered with veux

== Acronym ==
The proper acronym capitalization for the "Open System for Earthquake Engineering Simulation" is OpenSees, as opposed to OpenSEES. This reflects the same unconventional capitalization of Tcl.

== History ==
Prior to taking on the name "OpenSees," the framework was simply called "G3" in reference to the name of the PEER research group tasked with simulation development. The doctoral thesis of Frank McKenna on parallel object-oriented structural analysis formed the basis for "G3."

The current version as of March 2024 is 3.6.0.
