= Realsoft 3D =

- Developer(s): Realsoft Oy
- Initial release: 1990; 35 years ago
- Stable release: 7.0.41 / 2010
- Written in: C
- Operating system: AmigaOS, IRIX, Linux, Microsoft Windows, Mac OS X
- Available in: EN
- Type: 3D Software
- License: Proprietary
- Website: http://www.realsoft.fi, http://www.realsoft.com

Realsoft 3D is a modeling and raytracing application created by Realsoft Graphics Oy. Originally called Real 3D, it was developed for the Amiga computer and later also for Linux, Irix, Mac OS X, and Microsoft Windows.

It was initially written in 1983 on Commodore 64 by two Finnish brothers, Juha and Vesa Meskanen. The development of Real 3D was really started in 1985, as Juha Meskanen started his studies at the Lahti University of Applied Sciences, Finland. Juha's brother Vesa joined the development and abandoned his university career to start the Realsoft company in 1989.

== Versions history ==
=== Real 3D v1 ===
The first commercial Real 3D version was released on Amiga.

It used IFF REAL for its objects.

It featured constructive solid geometry, support for smooth curved quadric surfaces and a ray-tracer for photo realistic rendering.

1.2 was released in 1990, was already distributed in several European countries.

1.3 was released early 1991.

1.4 was released in December 1991. It was the last version derived from the original Real3D design.

Despite small version number increments, v1, v1.2 and v 1.3 were all major releases, with new manuals and packaging.

=== Real 3D v2 ===
It was released in 1993.

Version 2 was redesigned with a new source code base. It introduced groundbreaking features - booleans, CSG primitives, b-spline curves, physically based animation simulation, morph-based animation techniques and phenomenal rendered output. It took full advantage of the multi-tasking abilities of the Amiga - allowing the user to continue editing a scene on another window while it rendered.

Microsoft Windows version was released in 1994.

=== Real 3D v3 ===
Version 3.5 was released in 1996.

It was the last version based on v2 architecture. Realsoft had started a new major development project around 1994. The project involved a complete software rewrite, new object-oriented source code, platform independent design, modularity, and adoption of several other state-of–art development methods.

Amiga version 3.5, which is also the last version for this system, is now freely available by AmiKit.

=== Realsoft 3D v4 ===
Version 4 was released year 2000. Beginning with this release, Realsoft renamed the product to Realsoft 3D.

It was released on multiple platforms, including Microsoft Windows, Linux and SGI Irix.

4.1 trial version was released in 2001-02-21. Retail version was released in 2001-05-25.

4.2 upgrade was released in 2001-07-19.

Linux (Intel, AMD) and SGI Irix (MIPS) versions were released in 2001-07-24.

4.5 was released in 2002-10-23, which introduced for example caustics and global illumination rendering features. Linux version was released in 2002-11-03. Irix version of 4.5/SP1 (build 26.41b) was released in 2003-06-03.

=== Realsoft 3D v5 ===
Windows version was released in 2004-11-15.

It expanded the feature set in all program areas. It was also an important visual leap forward supporting full-color 32 bit icons.

Service pack 1 (5.1) for Windows was released in 2005-02-03.

Service Pack 2 (5.2) for Windows was released in 2005-10-02.

Service Pack 3 (5.3) for Windows was released in 2006-11-01. Mac OS X version was released in 2006-12-18.

Service Pack 4 (5.4) was released in 2007-05-01. Irix version was released in 2007-12-16.

=== Realsoft 3D v6 ===
Windows version was released in 2007-12-18. It introduced powerful parametric tools for plant modeling and building construction. 64-bit platforms were supported.

Service pack 1 (6.1) for Windows was released in 2008-05-15.

Linux version was released in 2008-07-01.

Mac OS X version was released in 2008-11-11.

=== Realsoft 3D v7 ===
It was announced in 2008-12-13, with projected release date between 2nd or 3rd quarter of 2009. It was released on December 7, 2009, for 32-bit and 64-bit Microsoft Windows.

=== Realsoft 3D v8 ===
It was released on 2018-12-06, for Linux, Windows and macOS in 2019-12-24 the upgrade was released.

== Reception ==
Jeff Paries of Computer Graphics World claimed version 4 is an excellent addition to your toolbox at a reasonable price.

== See also ==
- Lightwave 3D
- Cinema 4D
- Modo
- Blender
