= RFEM =

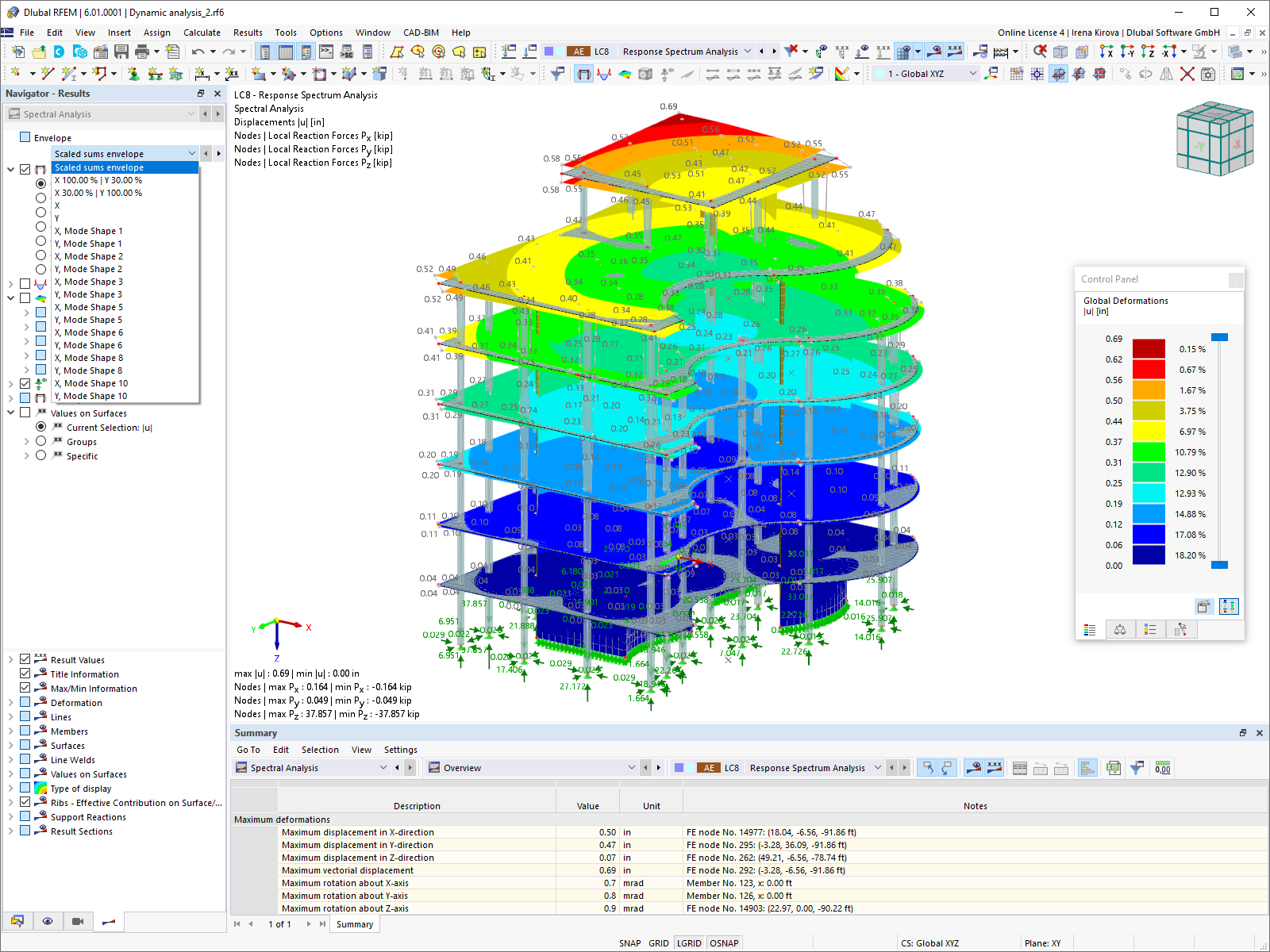
- Scaled sums envelope in RFEM
- Developer: Dlubal Software
- Stable release: 6.xx
- Operating system: Windows
- Available in: 11 languages
- List of languages English, German, French, Spanish, Portuguese, Italian, Czech, Polish, Russian, Chinese, Dutch
- Type: CAD/CAE/FEM
- License: Proprietary
- Website: dlubal.com/en/products/rfem-fea-software/rfem/what-is-rfem

RFEM is a 3D finite element analysis software working under Microsoft Windows computer operating systems. RFEM can be used for structural analysis and design of steel, concrete, timber, glass, membrane and tensile structures as well as for plant and mechanical engineering or dynamic analysis and analysis of steel joints.

The API technology Web Services allows you to create your own desktop or web-based applications by controlling all objects included in RFEM. By providing libraries and functions, you can develop your own design checks, effective modeling of parametric structures, as well as optimization and automation processes using the programming languages Python and C#.

RFEM is used by more than 13,000 companies, 130,000 users and many universities in 132 countries. As part of the research project "Thermal Imaging and Structural Analysis of Sandstone Monuments in Angkor", RFEM was used to create numerical models and for structural analysis.

== BIM Integration ==
RFEM offers numerous interfaces for data exchange within the BIM process. All relevant building data is digitally maintained within a three-dimensional model, which then is used throughout all of the planning stages. As a result, the various CAD and structural analysis programs are using the same model, which is directly transferred between the programs.

Besides direct interfaces to Autodesk AutoCAD, Autodesk Revit Structure, Autodesk Structural Detailing, Bentley Systems applications (ISM), Tekla Structures, Rhino and Grasshopper, RFEM has interfaces for Industry Foundation Classes, CIS/2 and others.

== Materials and cross-section libraries, load generation ==
RFEM's library of materials includes various types of concrete, metal, timber, glass, foil, gas and soil.

RFEM's cross-section library includes rolled, built-up, thin-walled, and thick-walled cross-sections for steel, concrete, and timber. In addition, any open and closed thin-walled or massive cross-sections are available from the program RSECTION.

With tools integrated in RFEM, wind, snow, opening and other loads can be generated and surface loads can be converted into member loads. Through integrated CFD wind simulation, wind loads can also be generated using the RWIND program.
