= FEMtools =

Computer-aided engineering software suite

FEMtools (Finite Element Model Tools) is a multi-functional, cross-platform and solver-independent family of CAE software programs providing analysis and scripting solutions for many different types of engineering simulation applications. The program is developed, supported and licensed by Dynamic Design Solutions ("DDS") NV, located in Leuven, Belgium.

== Overview ==
FEMtools consists of many tools that are licensed as part of standard configurations or as optional add-ons. The program is available on Microsoft Windows and Linux operating systems. The program can be used standalone or is used with solvers such as Nastran, ANSYS and Abaqus.

Applications are built on a proprietary framework that includes a graphical desktop environment, data interfacing, and database management. A graphics viewer supports visualization of meshes and analysis results. The software includes a scripting language and API for customization, as well as tools and modules for equation solving, matrix operations, data manipulation, diagnostics, and results validation. Custom applications can also be developed using the FEMtools framework.

The following technologies are available through the different programs configurations:.

• Simulation and test data interfacing.
• Database management, solver integration and CAE process automation.
• Mesh generation, mesh morphing and mesh quality verification.
• Classical and operational modal analysis.
• Operational deflection shapes (ODS) analysis.
• Rigid body properties extractor.
• Structural dynamics simulation using finite element and test models.
• Pre-test analysis and planning.
• Test-analysis correlation analysis.
• Sensitivity analysis.
• Automated FE model updating.
• Force identification.
• Design optimization (topology, shape, size, material).
• Design space sampling (Monte Carlo sampling, Design of Experiments, response surface modelling, genetic algorithms).
• Uncertainty propagation and probabilistic structural analysis.

== Application ==
FEMtools is designed to handle all sizes of finite element and test models for a wide range of industrial applications. Industrial applications can be found in the fields for structural dynamics troubleshooting, NVH, finite element model verification, validation and updating (V&V), uncertainty quantification and propagation, mesh coarsening or refinement, structural health monitoring (SHM), material and property identification, structural optimization, robust design and more.

FEMtools is used worldwide by prestigious companies like Airbus, Boeing, Caterpillar, Cummins, Ford, Goodrich, Honda, Honeywell, Johnson Controls, Lockheed, MAN, Northrop Grumman, Renault, Rolls-Royce, Siemens, Sony, Toyota, Volvo, Wartsila and Whirlpool.

FEMtools has been used as the backbone for Hong Kong Stonecutter's Bridge structural health evaluation system. Results obtained with the FEMtools model updating algorithm were used as a reference solution to assess custom-developed in-house software for updating FE models of civil engineering structures.

Academic applications include structural analysis education, algorithm development, and application research.

== History ==
1988 - Development started as a custom tool for FE model updating of Nastran and Ansys models that is called SYSTUNE.
1994 - Dynamic Design Solutions founded and acquiring the SYSTUNE source code.
1995 - SYSTUNE renamed as FEMtools.
2000 - Release of FEMtools 2.0 integrating a new scripting language.
2003 - Release of third generation (v3.0) of FEMtools.
2008 - Addition of a module for structural optimization.
2010 - Addition of a module for rigid body properties identification from FRFs.
2011 - Addition of a module for experimental modal analysis (classic input-output) and output-only operational modal analysis.
2017 - Release of FEMtools 4.0.
2023 - Addition of a module for vibration data acquisition with National Instruments front-ends.
2024 - Addition of AI-driven assistant.
2026 - Release of FEMtools 4.6.
