= Power engineering software =

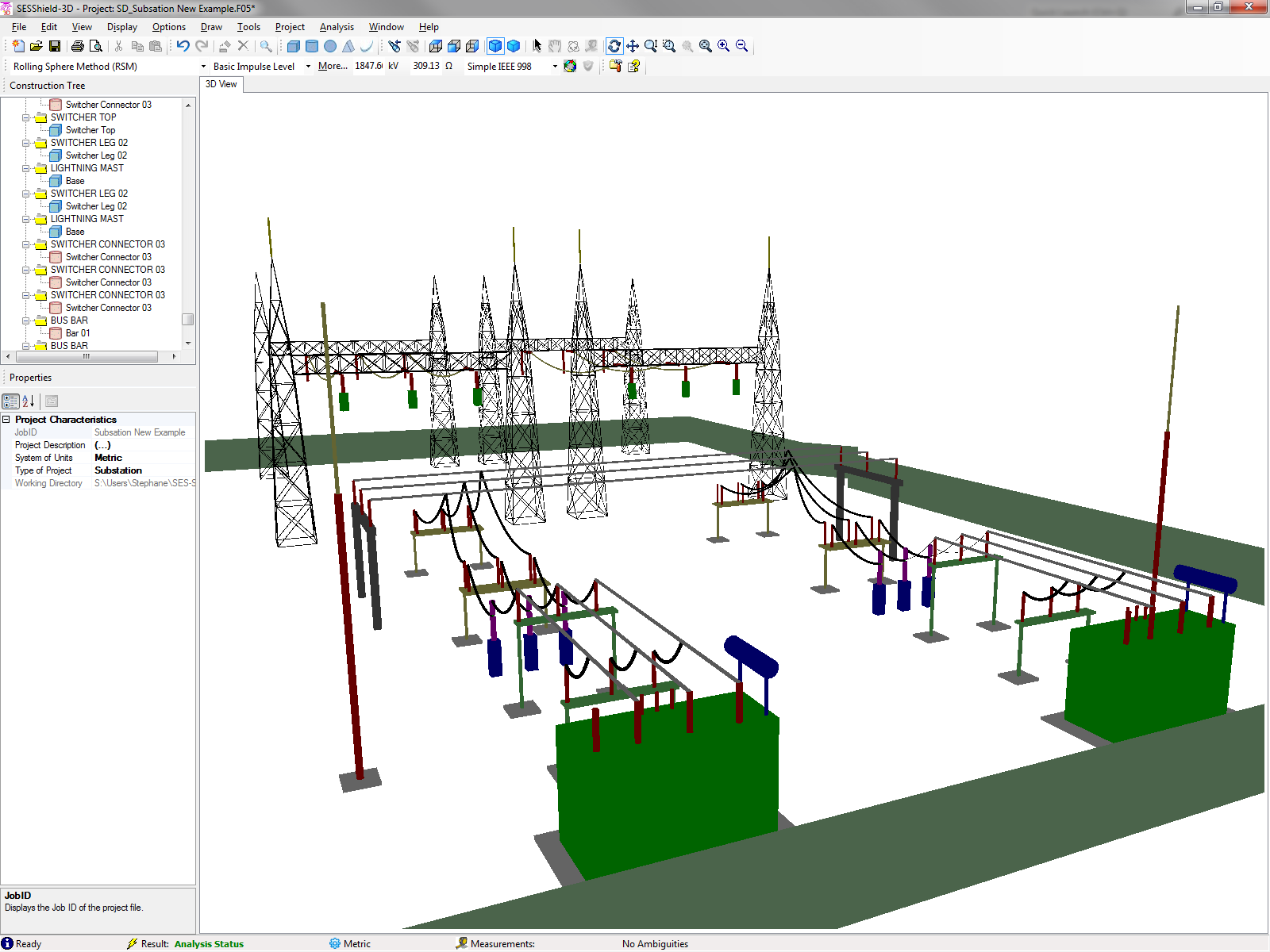
Analysis software for lightning protection used on a power substation.

Power engineering software comprises computer applications designed to model, simulate, analyze, and optimize electrical systems. These tools convert the physical characteristics and governing equations of power stations, transmission lines, power grids, substations, and industrial distribution networks into mathematical formulations that can be solved numerically.

== History ==
Digital calculation software for electrical engineering emerged during the late 1960s, initially focusing on plant performance monitoring and economic dispatch calculations. Early programs operated in batch processing environments using punched cards before transitioning to compiled languages such as Fortran and C.

In the mid-1970s, interactive graphic interfaces were introduced to power systems analysis, replacing batch card input with single-line diagram generation on visual display terminals; early platforms implementing this approach included IPSA, developed at the University of Manchester Institute of Science and Technology (UMIST) in 1974 and later maintained and developed by TNEI Services Ltd . Throughout the 1980s and 1990s, commercial software expanded to include graphical CAD workstations and personal computers, allowing simultaneous calculation of load flows, short circuits, and transient stability. Modern implementations incorporate scripting interfaces (predominantly in Python) for batch automation, stochastic simulations, and integration with energy management systems (EMS).

== Functional Classifications ==
=== Steady-State and Power Flow Analysis ===
Power flow software computes voltage magnitudes, phase angles, real and reactive power flows, and line losses across transmission and distribution networks. Solvers primarily implement iterative numerical methods, including the Newton–Raphson method, the Gauss–Seidel method, and the fast decoupled load flow method. Common operational applications include contingency analysis ($N-1$ reliability criteria), transformer tap optimization, and reactive power compensation studies.

=== Short-Circuit and Fault Analysis ===
Fault analysis packages calculate symmetrical and asymmetrical fault currents (such as single line-to-ground, line-to-line, and three-phase faults) to evaluate the interrupting ratings of circuit breakers and switchgear. Computations generally comply with standardized methods defined by the International Electrotechnical Commission (IEC 60909) and the IEEE (IEEE C37 standards).

=== Protection Coordination ===
Protection analysis software models the operating characteristics and response times of protective devices, including overcurrent relays, directional relays, distance relays, and fuses. These applications generate time-current characteristic (TCC) curves to ensure selective tripping sequences during system faults.

=== Dynamic Simulation and Electromagnetic Transients ===
Dynamic simulation packages are divided into two main timeframes:

- Electromechanical Transient Stability: Simulates generator rotor angle stability, frequency excursions, and voltage stability over seconds to minutes following disturbances.
- Electromagnetic Transients (EMT): Simulates high-frequency phenomena over microseconds to milliseconds, such as lightning strikes, switching surges, insulation coordination, and power electronics interactions using tools derived from the EMTP architecture.

=== Grounding and Lightning Protection ===
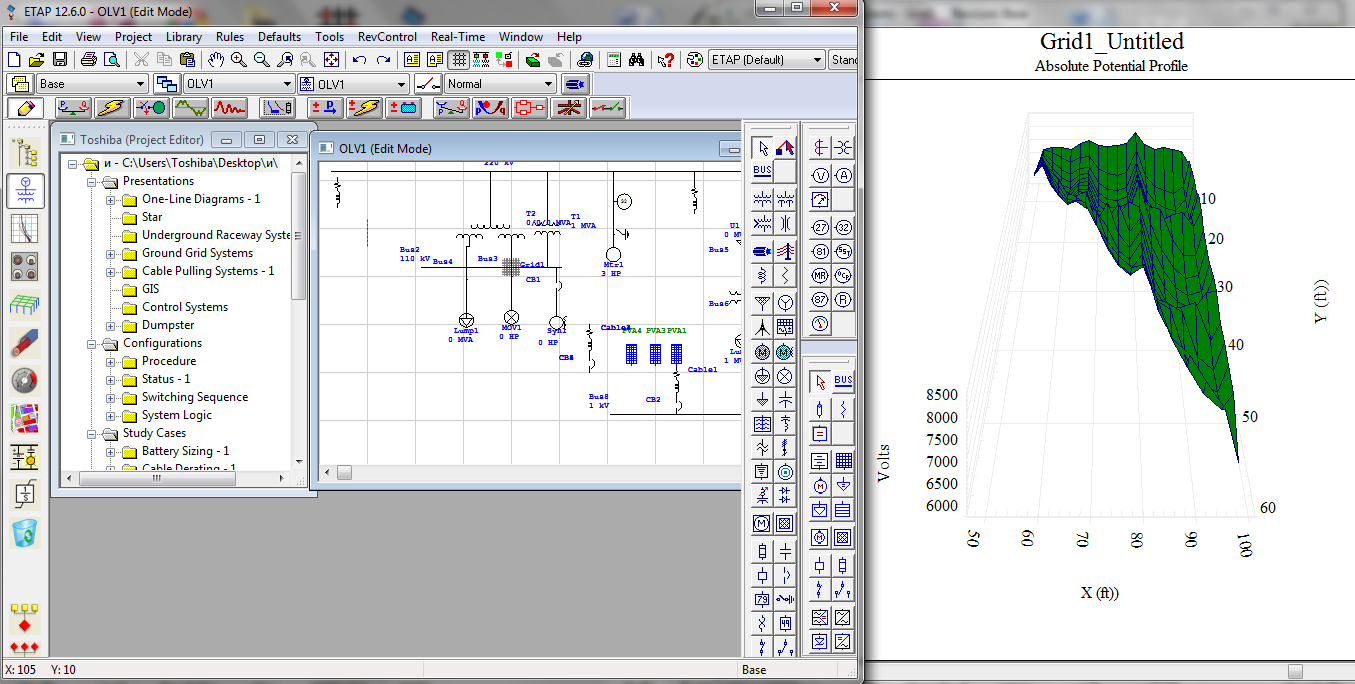
3D modeling grounding grid

Grounding analysis packages calculate soil resistivity models, ground potential rise (GPR), touch potentials, and step potentials in accordance with standards such as IEEE 80. Lightning shielding software simulates electrogeometric models and rolling sphere methods to determine shielding coverage for high-voltage substations and transmission corridors.

== Representative Software Platforms ==
Software	Developer / Maintainer	First Released	Core Capabilities	Licensing
IPSA	UMIST / TNEI Services Ltd	1974	Load flow, fault level (IEC 60909 / G74), protection coordination, transient stability, harmonic analysis, CIM/CGMES, Python scripting	Proprietary
ETAP	Operation Technology, Inc.	1986	Load flow, short circuit, arc flash, protection coordination, cable sizing, SCADA/EMS integration	Proprietary
PSS®E	Siemens PTI	1976	Transmission planning, dynamic simulation, power flow, optimal power flow, contingency analysis	Proprietary
PSS SINCAL	Siemens	1980s	Distribution and transmission planning, protection coordination, pipe network modeling	Proprietary
DIgSILENT PowerFactory	DIgSILENT GmbH	1985	AC/DC load flow, RMS/EMT simulation, protection grading, small-signal stability, modal analysis	Proprietary
CYME	Eaton	1986	Distribution network analysis, DER integration, reliability analysis, sub-network optimization	Proprietary
NEPLAN	NEPLAN AG	1988	Power system analysis, gas/water network integration, modular load flow, protection analysis	Proprietary
SKM Power*Tools	SKM Systems Analysis, Inc.	1992	Short-circuit analysis, arc flash hazard evaluation, protective device coordination	Proprietary
ERACS	RINA Consulting Ltd	1990	Balanced three-phase power systems analysis, load flow, fault calculations, harmonic studies	Proprietary
EA-PSM	Energy Advice	2013	Power flow, short circuit, arc flash, harmonic analysis, motor starting studies	Proprietary
PSCAD / EMTDC	Manitoba HVDC Research Centre	1974	Electromagnetic transient (EMT) simulation, power electronics modeling, HVDC and FACTS design	Proprietary
EMTP	PGSTech / EDF / Hydro-Québec	1982	Electromagnetic transients, switching overvoltages, insulation coordination, renewable integration	Proprietary
DSATools	Powertech Labs Inc.	1990s	Dynamic security assessment, transient stability (TSAT), voltage stability (VSAT), small-signal analysis	Proprietary
EasyPower	Bentley Systems	1984	Arc flash evaluation, short circuit, protection coordination, power flow	Proprietary

== See also ==
- Power-flow study
- Power system simulation
- Short circuit
