= SimScale =

Cloud-based computer-aided engineering (CAE) and simulation platform"

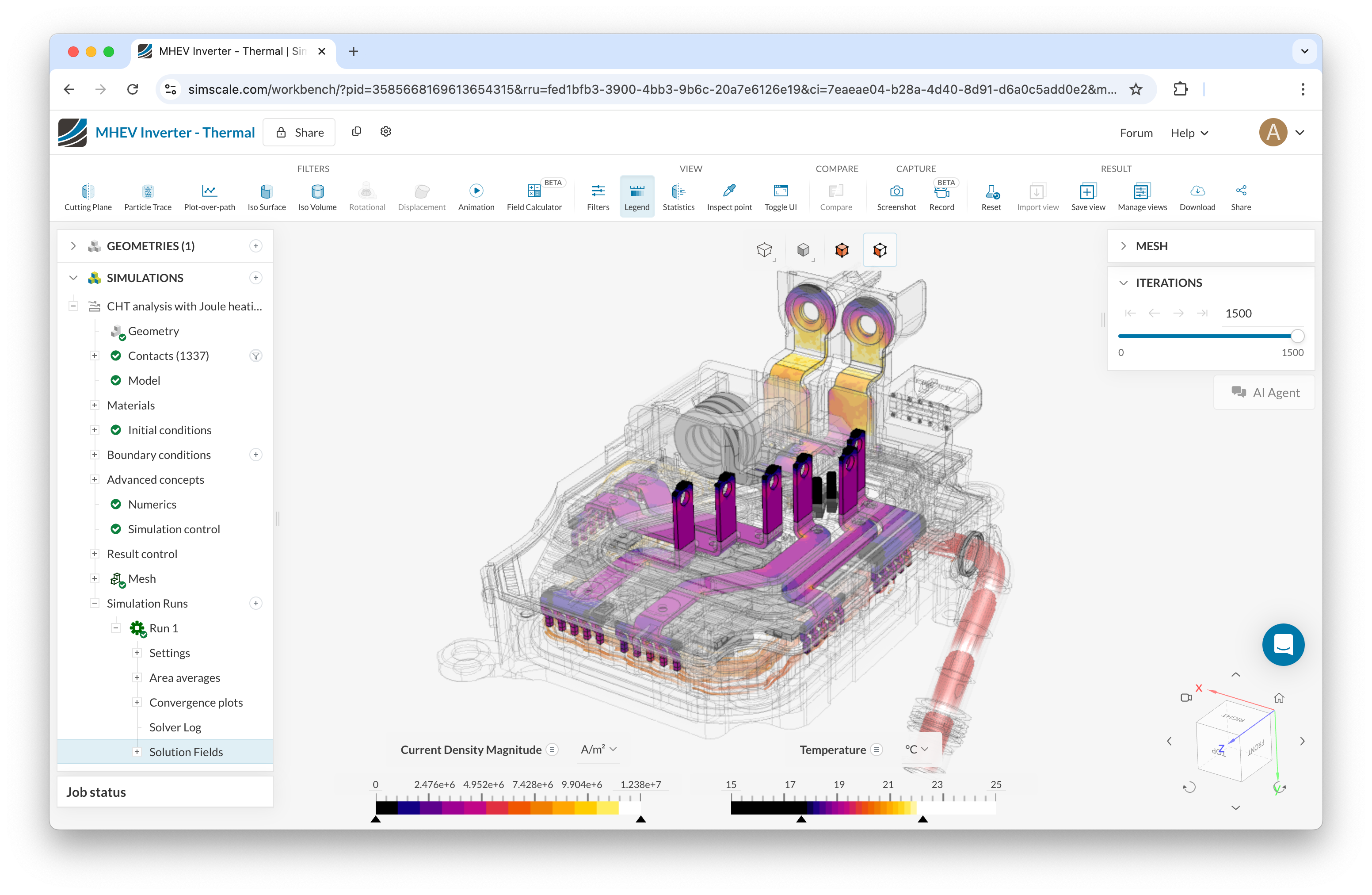
- Developer: SimScale GmbH
- Release: 2013; 13 years ago
- Platform: Web browser
- Type: Computer-aided engineering
- Website: simscale.com

SimScale is a computer-aided engineering (CAE) software platform for engineering AI & simulation. SimScale was developed by SimScale GmbH and integrates computational fluid dynamics, finite element analysis, thermal, and electromagnetic simulations with Artificial Intelligence (AI) to enable rapid virtual testing and design exploration. The backend of the platform uses both open source and proprietary simulation codes and Physics AI surrogate modeling frameworks using Graph Neural Networks. The platform is cloud-based and accessed through a web browser.

== History ==
SimScale was founded by five graduates of TU Munich in 2012 and first launched online in 2013. In September 2024, the company announced that it had 600,000 registered users on its platform.

== Features ==
The thermal module allows uncoupled thermo-mechanical, conjugate heat transfer and convective heat transfer simulations.

== Industrial applications ==
Japan-based Tokyowheel — a company that engineers technical carbon fiber racing wheels for competitive cyclists — used SimScale's CFD software component to determine the most aerodynamic wheel profile. QRC Technologies performed thermal simulations on SimScale to test multiple variations of their RF tester.

== Community Plan ==
On 2 December 2015, a community plan was announced making the platform accessible free of charge, based on a new investment round led by Union Square Ventures. It includes a one-time allotment of 3000 computation hours and 500 GB of storage for any registered user. Simulations and projects created by a user registered under the plan are accessible to all other users within the public project library.

== See also ==
- List of computational fluid dynamics software
