= STAAD =

Structural engineering software

STAAD or (STAAD.Pro) is a structural analysis and design software application originally developed by Research Engineers International (REI) in 1997. In late 2005, Research Engineers International was bought by Bentley Systems. STAAD stands for STructural Analysis And Design.

STAAD.Pro is one of the most widely used structural analysis and design software products worldwide. It can apply more than 90 international steel, concrete, timber and aluminium design codes.

It can make use of various forms of analysis from the traditional static analysis to more recent analysis methods like p-delta analysis, geometric non-linear analysis, Pushover analysis (Static-Non Linear Analysis) or a buckling analysis. It can also make use of various forms of dynamic analysis methods from time history analysis to response spectrum analysis. The response spectrum analysis feature is supported for both user defined spectra as well as a number of international code specified spectra.

Additionally, STAAD.Pro is interoperable with applications such as RAM Connection, AutoPIPE, SACS and many more engineering design and analysis applications to further improve collaboration between the different disciplines involved in a project. STAAD can be used for analysis and design of all types of structural projects from plants, buildings, and bridges to towers, tunnels, metro stations, water/wastewater treatment plants and more.

== Important Features ==
=== Analytical Modeling ===
Analytical model can be created using the ribbon-based user interface, by editing the command file or by importing several other files types like dxf, cis/2 etc. The model geometry can even be generated from the data of macro-enabled applications (like Microsoft Excel, Microstation etc.) by using Macros.

=== Physical Modeling ===
Physical modeling has been a significant feature included in the program. STAAD.Pro Physical Modeler takes advantage of physical modeling to simplify modeling of a structure, which in turn more accurately reflects the process of building a model. Beams and surfaces are placed in the model on the scale of which they would appear in the physical world. A column may span multiple floors and a surface represents an entire floor of a building, for example. A joint is then generated anywhere two physical objects meet in the model (as well as at the free ends of cantilevered members, for convenience).

=== STAAD Building Planner ===
STAAD Building Planner is a module that enables seamless generation of building models that can be analyzed and designed thereafter in the program itself. Operations like defining geometry, making changes in the geometric specifications are matters of only few clicks in this workflow..

=== Steel AutoDrafter ===
Steel AutoDrafter workflow extracts planar drawings and material take-off from a structural steel model prepared in STAAD.Pro. It produces excellent quality plans at any level and sections in any of the orthogonal directions.

=== STAAD.Beava ===
The general philosophy governing the design of bridges is that, subject to a set of loading rules and constraints, the worst effects due to load application should be established and designed against. The process of load application can be complex as governing rules can impose interdependent parameters such as loaded length on a lane, lane factors, and load intensity. To obtain the maximum design effects, engineers have to try many loading situations on a trial and error basis.

This leads to the generation of many live load application instances (and a large volume of output data) that then must be combined with dead load and other effects, as well. Bridge Deck is used to minimize the load application process while complying with national code requirements.

The program is based on the use of influence surfaces, which are generated by STAAD.Pro as part of the loading process. An influence surface for a given effect on a bridge deck relates its value to movement of a unit load over the point of interest. The influence surface is a three-dimensional form of an influence line for a single member (or, in other words, it is a 2D influence function).

STAAD.Pro will automatically generate influence surfaces for effects such as bending moments for elements, deflection in all the degrees of freedom of nodes, and support reactions. The user then instruct the program to utilize the relevant influence surfaces and, with due regards to code requirements, optimize load positions to obtain the maximum desired effects.

=== Advanced Concrete Design ===
The Advanced Concrete Design workflow provides direct access for STAAD.Pro models to leverage the power of the RCDC application. This is a standalone application, which is operated outside the STAAD.Pro environment, but requires a model and results data from a suitable analysis. The model should typically be formed from beams and columns (plates are currently not supported). RCDC can be used to design the following objects: Pile Caps, Footings, Columns and walls, Beams, Slabs.

As the projects progresses, each design created in RCDC is retained and displayed when RCDC is re-entered, so that previous designs can be recalled and/or continued. Detailed drawings and BBS of excellent quality can be generated as required and they are quite ready to be sent for execution.

=== Advanced Slab Design ===
The STAAD.Pro Advanced Slab Design workflow is an integrated tool that works from within the STAAD.Pro environment. Concrete slabs can be defined, and the data can be transferred to RAM Concept. The data passed into RAM Concept includes the geometry, section and material properties, loads and combination information, and analysis results.

=== Earthquake Mode ===
Eurocode 8: Part 1 contains specific requirements and recommendations for building structures that are to be constructed in seismic regions. Essentially, these fundamental requirements have been provided to ensure that the structures can sustain the seismic loads without collapse and also – where required– avoid suffering unacceptable damage and can continue to function after an exposure to a seismic event. This STAAD.Pro workflow is used to check if the structure conforms to the basic geometric recommendations made in Eurocode 8 (EC8). This workflow is in addition to the normal post-processing workflow which gives the various analysis results. These checks are intended to give you a "feel" for the structure and are not mandatory to proceed to the design phase.

=== OpenSTAAD Macro Editor ===
OpenSTAAD is a library of exposed functions enabling engineers access STAAD.Pro’s internal functions and routines as well as its graphical commands. With OpenSTAAD, one can use VBA macros to perform such tasks as automating repetitive modeling or post-processing tasks or embedding customized design routines. Following an open architecture paradigm, OpenSTAAD was built using ATL, COM, and COM+ standards as specified by Microsoft. This allows OpenSTAAD to be used in a macro application like Microsoft Excel or Autodesk AutoCAD. OpenSTAAD can also be used to link STAAD data to Web-based applications using ActiveX, HTML, and ASP. Through the in-built Macro Editor, one can leverage the functionalities of OpenSTAAD and automate the analysis and design workflows, thereby eliminating the chance of occurrence of potential errors due to manual intervention and reducing the required time for execution of the whole workflow (as compared to the manual execution time), to a large extent.
