= Bentley Systems =

American software development

Coordinates: 40.065500°N 75.687817°W

Bentley Systems, Incorporated

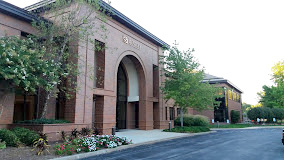
- Type: Public
- Traded as: Nasdaq: BSY (Class B); S&P 400 component
- Industry: Computer software
- Founded: 1984; 42 years ago
- Founders: Keith A. Bentley; Barry J. Bentley; Raymond B. Bentley
- Headquarters: Exton, Pennsylvania, U.S.
- Key people: Nicholas Cumins (CEO)
- Products: Software
- Revenue: ▲US$1.5 billion (2025)
- Net income: ▲US$278 million (2025)
- Number of employees: 5,800 (2025)
- Website: bentley.com

Bentley Systems, Incorporated is a US-based software development company that develops, manufactures, licenses, sells and supports computer software and services for the design, construction, and operation of infrastructure globally. The company's software serves the building, plant, civil, and geospatial markets in the areas of architecture, engineering, construction (AEC) and operations. Their software products are used to design, engineer, build, and operate large constructed assets such as roadways, railways, bridges, buildings, industrial plants, power plants, and utility networks.

Bentley Systems is headquartered in Exton, Pennsylvania, United States, but reports development, sales and other departments in 45 countries. In 2025, the company reported revenue of $1.5 billion in 189 countries.

== History ==
Retired logo and wordmark

Keith A. Bentley and Barry J. Bentley founded Bentley Systems in 1984. In an interview with trade publication Geo Week News, Keith Bentley recounted how he had previously developed CAD software while working as a programmer at DuPont. After retaining rights to this software, he joined his brother Barry's chemistry software startup, and they later pivoted to the CAD software market. Their brothers Greg, Scott, and Ray later joined the company, which relocated to Pennsylvania. They introduced the commercial version of PseudoStation in 1985, which allowed users of Intergraph's VAX systems to use low-cost graphics terminals to view and modify the designs on their Intergraph IGDS (Interactive Graphics Design System) installations. An MS-DOS version of MicroStation was introduced in 1986.

In April 2002, Bentley filed for an initial public offering, but it was withdrawn before taking effect. In November 2016, German-based Siemens announced it would pay about $76 million for a minority stake in Bentley, as well as invest in developing joint software with it.

In September 2020, Bentley Systems set terms of its IPO valuing the company at about $4.96 billion. The company would offer 10.75 million shares priced between $17 and $19 per share.

In 2023, the company reported that its annual 2022 revenue exceeded $1 billion.

Also in 2023, Keith Bentley retired from his Chief Technology role, and Greg Bentley retired in March 2024. In July 2024, Chief Operating Officer Nicholas Cumins became the first non-family member to lead the company as CEO.

== Products ==
Bentley Systems sells software for infrastructure modeling, simulation, construction, operations, and analytics. The company's Seequent subsidiary sells geological and geophysical modeling and analysis software. Principle offerings include:

=== Engineering and simulation applications ===
MicroStation is computer-aided design (CAD) software used in infrastructure projects. It provides tools for drafting, modeling, and visualization. The platform includes features for referencing external files, conducting design reviews, and integrating geospatial data. The company also provides Open applications for modelling and simulation based on MicroStation technology, designed to support workflows across infrastructure sectors. Modeling applications include:

- OpenRoads - for transportation infrastructure design
- OpenRail - for railway design
- OpenBridge Designer - for bridge design
- OpenBuildings Designer, including Openbuildings Station Designer - for architectural and building design
- OpenFlows Flood - for hydraulic and hydrologic modeling, analysis, design & operation
- OpenPlant - for process plant design and operations
- OpenUtilities - for electrical systems and substations design
- OpenSite Designer - for modeling and analysis of site design project

Open simulation applications include:

- STAAD - structural analysis and design software
- AutoPipe - pipe stress analysis software
- Power Line Systems (PLS) - for analysis and simulation of overhead electric power transmission lines and their structures

=== Bentley Infrastructure Cloud ===
Bentley Infrastructure Cloud is an integrated online application that combines ProjectWise software for project delivery, SYNCHRO for construction management, and AssetWise for asset operations. It provides a unified data environment to improve collaboration.

ProjectWise is information management software used to manage CAD, BIM, geospatial and project data from a variety of vendors. AssetWise is asset lifecycle information management (ALIM) software used to manage project assets including documents, tags, associated metadata, and 3D models. The company's SYNCHRO software is used for 4D construction planning, scheduling, and productivity tracking, for teams on construction sites and in the office.

=== Asset Analytics ===
Bentley's Asset Analytics portfolio applies artificial intelligence and digital twin workflows to improve infrastructure monitoring and maintenance. The product integrates data captured with physical devices such as IoT sensors, drones, and dashcams, with digital twins to create a comprehensive view of infrastructure such as bridges, dams, and large transportation networks.

The portfolio includes Blyncsy, AI-powered software that analyzes roadway conditions using image date and machine learning.

=== Seequent ===
Bentley's Seequent subsidiary develops and sells 3D modeling and analysis software for the geosciences, mining, civil engineering, and energy industries. Seequent's portfolio includes Leapfrog for 3D geological modeling and visualization, GeoStudio for geotechnical and geoenvironmental analysis, and Geosoft for 3D earth modeling and geoscience data management. Seequent's Evo cloud platform integrates geoscience data from Seequent and third-party applications into one platform.

=== iTwin Platform ===
Bentley's iTwin Platform is a cloud-native platform designed to enable digital twin workflows for infrastructure. Digital twins representations allow customers to simulate physical assets such as roads, bridges, and buildings, while integrating engineering models, geospatial data, and enterprise information.

The iTwin platform integrates with 3D Tiles, through Bentley's acquisition of Cesium, the creator of the 3D Tiles community standard. This allows developers to combine 3D geospatial data with digital asset data to create scalable digital twins.

=== Cesium ===
Bentley Systems Cesium software is an open platform for building 3D geospatial applications. Cesium also created the 3D Tiles community standard, an Open Geospatial Consortium (OGC) standard for streaming large 3D data sets.

In 2025, Bentley started integrating its iTwin Platform with Cesium, beginning with adding iTwin Capture reality modeling services to Cesium. The company also announced 3D tile integration with its MicroStation product.

== Artificial intelligence ==
Bentley invests in artificial intelligence and machine learning, through internal research and development, and acquisitions, including AIworx (2018) and Blyncsy (2023). Bentley software, including OpenRoads, OpenRail, and ProjectWise, includes the Bentley Copilot, a context-aware AI assistant that guides users through workflows, surfaces relevant documents, and can modify 3D models.

OpenSite+ is Bentley's first application to incorporate generative AI. It also offers AI-driven variants of its SYNCHRO (SYNCHRO+) and Substation (Substation+) applications.

In May 2026, Bentley Systems published the STAAD MCP server to the open Model Context Protocol (MCP) Registry. This development connects AI agents directly with STAAD.Pro, allowing different AI systems to access the application's structural validation functions and data.

== Operations ==
Bentley is headquartered in Exton, Pennsylvania. Nicholas Cumins is the company's CEO. The company reports 5,800 employees in 45 countries, and in 2025 reported $1.5 Billion in revenue in 189 countries.

== Partnerships ==
- Microsoft - Since 2014, some products have been based on the Microsoft Azure cloud computing platform. In 2020 Bentley and Microsoft announced expansion of a strategic alliance to advance the use of digital twin in city planning and citizen engagement.
- NVIDIA - in 2021, Bentley announced a partnership with NVIDIA to bring infrastructure digital twins to NVIDIA Omniverse.

== Acquisitions ==
On June 18, 1997, Bentley acquired IdeaGraphix, a developer of MicroStation-based application software for architecture, engineering, and facilities management. On January 15, 1998, Bentley acquired Jacobus. On January 2, 2001, Bentley acquired Intergraph's civil engineering, plot-services and raster conversion software businesses. On October 17, 2001, Bentley Systems bought Geopak design software for road and rail infrastructure.

Bentley Systems acquired Rebis in 2003, Infrasoft Corporation in 2003, Haestad Methods, Inc. in 2004, and then agreed to acquire netGuru's Research Engineers International (REI) business which included its STAAD structural analysis and design product line on August 31, 2005. Bentley acquired GEF-RIS AG in 2006, KIWI Software in 2007, C.W. Beilfuss and Associates in 2007, and TDV GmbH, an analysis and design software provider for bridge engineering, in May 2007.

In early 2008, Bentley acquired Hevacomp, Ltd., LEAP Software, Inc., the promis•e product line from ECT International, and Common Point for mainstream construction simulation.

On October 13, 2009, Bentley added geotechnical and geoenvironmental capabilities with the acquisition of gINT Software. On February 9, 2010, Bentley Systems announced two acquisitions: Exor Corporation and Enterprise Informatics. On March 2, 2011, Bentley Systems acquired SACS software for offshore structural analysis from Engineering Dynamics, Inc. Also in 2011, Bentley acquired FormSys and Pointools Ltd., a British developer of point-cloud software technology.

In 2012, Bentley acquired the elcoSystem software business of Hannappel Software, as well as InspectTech Systems, USA, a provider of field inspection applications and asset management services for bridges and other transportation assets. Also that year it acquired Canadian-based Ivara, the Microprotol pressure vessel design and analysis software from EuResearch, and SpecWave. In 2013, Bentley acquired topoGRAPH, a provider of surveying software, as well as the MOSES software business from Ultramarine. On February 25, 2014, Bentley acquired DocQnet Systems’ eB Services BizDocQnet Systems. Later that year, it acquired SITEOPS, optimization software for enhanced land development site design, from Blueridge Analytics. Bentley acquired C3global for predictive modeling in 2015, and also that year acquired Acute3D, and the reality modeling creator e-on.

In 2016, Bentley acquired the progressive assurance platform ComplyPro from UK-based ComplyServe.

On January 23, 2018, Bentley acquired S-Cube Futuretech Pvt Ltd. to expand its offerings specific to the concrete engineering design and documentation software users in India, Southeast Asia, and the Middle East. On April 26, 2018, Bentley acquired Dutch geotechnical modelling company Plaxis B.V. On July 15, 2018, Bentley acquired Canadian geotechnical modeling company SOILVISION Systems Ltd. in order to enhance its 3D geotechnical offerings. Also in 2018, the company acquired Synchro, Agency9, LEGION, ACE enterprise Slovakia, and Alworx.

In 2019, Bentley acquired SignCAD Systems, Keynetix, and Citilabs, Inc. & Orbit GeoSpatial Technologies.

In 2020, Bentley acquired UK based consultancy Professional Construction Strategies Group (PCSG), and SRO Solutions.

In 2021, Bentley acquired Ontracks Consulting, INRO Software, SPIDA Software, and Seequent Holdings Limited, and in 2022 acquisitions included Power Line Systems, ADINA R&D, Inc., and Eagle.io.

In 2023, Bentley acquired Salt Lake City, Utah-based Blyncsy, a provider of breakthrough artificial intelligence services for departments of transportation to support operations and maintenance activities. In September 2024, Bentley announced the acquisition of Cesium GS, Inc., a provider of 3D geospatial software applications and platforms.

In January 2026, Bentley announced the acquisitions of Talon Aerolytics, a provider of products for site surveys, inspections, and asset digitation; and the acquisition of technology assets from Pontivo, including AI-driven inventory and damage detection technology, drone technology and geolocation capabilities.

== Bentley Infrastructure 500 ==
Since 2010, Bentley annually published a ranking of the top owners of infrastructure from both the public and private sectors.

== See also ==
- Comparison of computer-aided design software
- Comparison of 3D computer graphics software
- List of companies based in the Philadelphia area
- List of collaborative software
- List of 3D computer graphics software
