= List of University of California, Berkeley alumni in academia =

This page lists notable alumni and students of the University of California, Berkeley. Alumni who also served as faculty are listed in bold font, with degree and year.

Notable faculty members are in the article List of UC Berkeley faculty.

== Chancellors and presidents ==
- Paul Alivisatos, Ph.D. 1986 – former provost of UC Berkeley (2017–2021), president of the University of Chicago (2021–present)
- Douglas J. Bennet, M.A. 1960 – president of Wesleyan University (1995–2007); former CEO of National Public Radio (1983–1993)
- Frederic Lister Burk, B.L. 1883 – founding president of San Francisco State University (1899–1924)
- Wen-Tsuen Chen, M.S. 1973, Ph.D. 1976 – president of National Tsing Hua University, Taiwan (2006–2010), Distinguished Chair Professor of National Tsing Hua University, Distinguished Research Fellow of Academia Sinica, Lifelong National Chair of the Ministry of Education (Taiwan), Fellow of the IEEE, winner of the Taylor L. Booth Education Award
- G. Wayne Clough, Ph.D. 1969 – president of Georgia Tech (1994–2008)
- Robert E. Connick, Ph.D. 1942 – professor of chemistry, dean of the College of Chemistry, vice-chancellor, UC Berkeley
- Dale R. Corson, Ph.D. 1938 – president of Cornell University (1969–1977)
- Reginald DesRoches, B.S. 1990, M.S. 1992, Ph.D. 1998 – president of Rice University (2022–present)
- Gregory L. Fenves, M.S. 1980, Ph.D. 1984 – president of Emory University (2020–present)
- Dave Frohnmayer, J.D. 1967 – president of the University of Oregon (1994–2009)
- Geoffrey Gamble, Ph.D. 1975 – president, Montana State University (2000–2009)
- Michael J. Garanzini, S.J., Ph.D. 1986 (joint degree with GTU-Berkeley) – president of Loyola University of Chicago (2001–present)
- David P. Gardner, M.A. 1959, Ph.D. 1966 – 15th president of the University of California
- Suresh Garimella, Ph.D. 1989 – v of the University of Vermont (2019–present)
- Andrew Gonzalez, Ph.D. 1970 – president of De La Salle University in Manila, Philippines (1979–1991, 1994–1998)
- Kohei Itoh, M.S. 1992, Ph.D. 1994 – president of Keio University in Tokyo, Japan (2021–present)
- Sam Karunaratne, 1967 – vice-chancellor of the University of Moratuwa (1995–1999), Chancellor of the Sri Lanka Institute of Information Technology (1999–present)
- Robert Kelley – 11th president of the University of North Dakota
- Clark Kerr, Ph.D. 1939 – professor of industrial relations, chancellor of UC Berkeley (1952–58), president of the University of California (1958–67)
- Jonathan Koppell, M.A. 1996, Ph.D. 2001 – president of Montclair State University (2021–present)
- Lawrence J. Lau, M.A. 1966, Ph.D. 1969 – vice-chancellor of The Chinese University of Hong Kong (CUHK) (2004–2010)
- Karl C. Leebrick, B.S 1911, M.S. 1913, Ph.D 1917 – president of Kent State University and Moanaolu Community Junior College
- Shirley A. R. Lewis, M.S.W. c. 1962 – president of Paine College
- Gary S. May, M.S. 1987 and Ph.D. 1991 – chancellor of the University of California, Davis
- C. Daniel Mote Jr., B.S. 1959, M.S. 1960, Ph.D. 1963 – president of the University of Maryland, College Park (1998–2010)
- Emil M. Mrak, B.S. 1926, M.S, Ph.D. 1936 – former chancellor of the University of California, Davis
- David W. Oxtoby, Ph.D. 1975 – president of Pomona College (2003–2017)
- Darryll Pines, B.S. 1986 – president of the University of Maryland, College Park (2020–present)
- Kenneth Pitzer, Ph.D. 1937 – dean of the College of Chemistry (1951–60), professor of chemistry; president of Rice University (1961–1968) and Stanford University (1969–1971)
- William Powers Jr., B.A. 1967 – president of the University of Texas, Austin (2006–present)
- Aurelia Henry Reinhardt, B.A. 1898 – president of Mills College (1916–1943)
- Suzanne M. Rivera, MSW 1993 – president of Macalester College (2020–present)
- Ron Robin, Ph.D. 1986 – historian and 11th president of the University of Haifa
- Timothy Sands, B.S. 1980, M.S. 1981, Ph.D. 1984 – president of Virginia Tech (2014–present), acting president of Purdue University (2012–2013), provost of Purdue University (2010–2014)
- Akilagpa Sawyerr – vice-chancellor of the University of Ghana (1985–1992)
- Glenn T. Seaborg, Ph.D. 1937 – chancellor, Berkeley campus (1958–1961) (also listed in the section Nobel laureates)
- Patricia Meyer Spacks, Ph.D. 1955 – president of the American Academy of Arts and Sciences (2001–present); Edgar F. Shannon Professor Emerita of English, University of Virginia
- Robert Sproul, B.S. 1913 – president of the University of California, Berkeley (1930–1958)
- Timothy W. Tong, M.S. 1978, Ph.D. 1980 – president of the Hong Kong Polytechnic University (Poly U) (2009–present)
- Blake Van Leer, M.S. 1918, Ph.D. 1924 – president of the Georgia Institute of Technology (Georgia Tech) (1944–1956)
- John Philip Wernette, A.B. 1924 – president of the University of New Mexico (1945–1948)
- Timothy P. White, Ph.D. 1977 – president of the University of Idaho (2004–2008); chancellor, University of California, Riverside (2008–present)
- O. Meredith Wilson, Ph.D. 1943 – president of the University of Oregon (1954–1960) and the University of Montana (1960–1967)
- Xiang Zhang, Ph.D. 1996 – president and vice chancellor of the University of Hong Kong (2018–present)

== Deans, directors, department heads ==
- Asad Abidi, M.S. 1978, Ph.D. 1981 – dean of the Lahore University of Management Sciences, member of the National Academy of Engineering
- Vikram David Amar, AB 1985 – dean and Iwan Foundation Professor of Law, University of Illinois College of Law
- Steven Bachrach, Ph.D. – dean of Science at Monmouth University, previously the Dr D. R. Semmes Distinguished Professor of Chemistry at Trinity University in San Antonio, Texas
- Barry C. Barish, B.A. 1957, Ph.D. 1962 – Maxine and Ronald Linde Professor of Physics, emeritus, at Caltech, member of the National Academy of Sciences, Fellow of the AAAS, director of the International Linear Collider, director of the Laser Interferometer Gravitational-Wave Observatory (LIGO)
- Robert O. Briggs, BA 1951 – former director of the University of California Marching Band (1973–1995)
- Jeffrey Brock, Ph.D. 1997 – dean of the Yale School of Engineering & Applied Science, dean of Science of the Faculty of Arts and Sciences, Zhao and Ji Professor of Mathematics at Yale University
- Shih-Fu Chang, M.S. 1991, Ph.D. 1993 – dean of the Fu Foundation School of Engineering and Applied Science and Morris A. and Alma Schapiro Professor of Engineering at Columbia University; member of the National Academy of Engineering and National Academy of Inventors
- Constance J. Chang-Hasnain, Ph.D. 1987 – John R. Whinnery Chair Professor, electrical engineering and computer sciences department; chair, nanoscale science and engineering graduate group, University of California, Berkeley; fellow of the IEEE, OSA and IEE
- You-Hua Chu, Ph.D. 1981 – former director of the Academia Sinica Institute of Astronomy and Astrophysics, former chair of the Department of Astronomy, University of Illinois Urbana-Champaign
- Michael J. Cima, B.S. 1982, Ph.D. 1986 – director of the MIT Ceramics Processing Research Laboratory; Sumitomo Electric Industries Chair Professor at the Massachusetts Institute of Technology
- David Culler, B.A. 1980 – chair of the Department of Computer Science at UC Berkeley, associate chair of the Electrical Engineering and Computer Sciences (UC Berkeley), and associate CIO of the College of Engineering (UC Berkeley); co-founder of smart grid monitoring company Arch Rock (acquired by Cisco Systems), founding director of Infel Research, UC Berkeley, faculty director of i4Energy (also listed in Founders and co-founders)
- S. George Djorgovski, Ph.D. 1985 – director, Center for Data Driven Discovery and professor of Astronomy and Data Science, Caltech
- Persis Drell, Ph.D. 1983 – provost of Stanford University; dean of the School of Engineering at Stanford University; Director of the Stanford Linear Accelerator Center (SLAC) (2007–2012)
- Soumitra Dutta, M.S., Ph.D. computer science – dean of the Saïd Business School at the University of Oxford, dean of the SC Johnson College of Business at Cornell University (2012–2018)
- Deborah Estrin, B.S. 1980 – professor of computer science at UCLA, director of the UCLA Center for Embedded Networked Sensing (CENS), fellow of the ACM, Fellow of the IEEE, and Fellow of the AAAS
- George Gerbner, B.A. 1942 – former dean of the Annenberg School for Communication at the University of Pennsylvania; founder of cultivation theory
- Eliza Atkins Gleason, M.A. 1936 – founding dean of the Atlanta University School of Library Service and the first African American to earn a Ph.D. in Library Science
- Andrea Goldsmith, B.S. 1986, M.S. 1991, Ph.D. 1996 – dean of the Princeton University School of Engineering and Applied Science and Arthur LeGrand Doty Professor of Electrical Engineering at Princeton University
- Barbara J. Grosz, M.A. 1971, Ph.D. 1977 – dean, Radcliffe Institute of Advanced Study (2008–present); Higgins Professor of Natural Sciences, Harvard University; first tenured female professor at Harvard's School of Engineering and Applied Sciences; elected to National Academy of Engineering (2008)
- Robert Harvey, Ph.D. 1988 – chair, Department of Cultural Studies & Comparative Literature, Stony Brook University
- Tyrone Hayes, Ph.D. 1993 – associate dean for Diversity, Equity and Inclusion; professor of Integrative Biology, UC Berkeley; member of the National Academy of Sciences
- Dan Fenno Henderson, doctorate (1955) – founder of the University of Washington Asian law program
- Giles Henderson – Fulbright Scholar 1966–67; master of Pembroke College, Oxford
- John Joannopoulos, B.A. 1968, Ph.D. 1974 – director of the Institute for Soldier Nanotechnologies and Francis Wright Davis Professor of Physics, Massachusetts Institute of Technology
- Ray Kappe, B.A. – founding chair of the Department of Architecture at California State Polytechnic University, Pomona
- Harry C. Katz, AB 1973, Ph.D. 1977 – dean of Cornell University School of Industrial and Labor Relations
- David R. Liu, Ph.D. 1999 – director of the Merkin Institute of Transformative Technologies in Healthcare, vice chair of the faculty, Broad Institute and the Thomas Dudley Cabot Professor of the Natural Sciences, Harvard University
- Abbas Milani, B.A. 1970 – Hamid and Christian Moghadam Director of Iranian Studies at Stanford University
- Linda B. Nilson, B.A. 1970 – director emeritus of the Office of Teaching Effectiveness and Innovation at Clemson University
- V. Vance Roley – dean of the Shidler College of Business at the University of Hawaii
- Shawna Yang Ryan, B.A. 1998 – director and professor of Creative Writing, University of Hawaii at Manoa
- Kenneth Sacks, Ph.D. 1976 – dean of the college, professor of History and Classics, Brown University
- Charles Shank, B.S. 1965, M.S. 1966, Ph.D. 1969 – director of the Lawrence Berkeley National Laboratory (1990–2005)
- Jane Shaw, Ph.D. 1994 – dean of Divinity, New College, Oxford since 2001 and formerly dean, Regent's Park College, Oxford
- Kirk R. Smith, B.A. 1968, M.P.H. 1972, Ph.D. 1977 – director of Global Health and Environment Program and professor of Environmental Health Science, University of California, Berkeley School of Public Health; elected to National Academy of Sciences in 1997; shared the 2007 Nobel Peace Prize; awarded the 2012 Tyler Prize for Environmental Achievement
- Robert I. Sutton, B.A. 1977 – co-director of the Center for Work, Technology, and Organization at Stanford University, faculty member of the Stanford Technology Ventures Program, Professor of Management Science and Engineering at Stanford University
- Max Tegmark, Ph.D. 1994 – president of the Future of Life Institute and professor of Physics at the Massachusetts Institute of Technology
- Troy Van Voorhis, Ph.D. 2001 – chair of the MIT Chemistry Department and Haslam and Dewey Professor of Chemistry, Massachusetts Institute of Technology
- A. R. Frank Wazzan, B.S. 1959, M.S. 1961, Ph.D. 1963 – dean of the UCLA School of Engineering and Applied Sciences, 1986–2001
- Frederick Wedge, 1928 – dean of the College of Liberal Arts, Pasadena College
- Shlomo Zilberstein, Ph.D. 1993 – professor and associate dean of Research and Engagement at the University of Massachusetts Amherst, fellow of the Association for the Advancement of Artificial Intelligence

== Professors with endowments or named chairs ==
- Sanjeev Arora, Ph.D. 1994 – Charles Fitzmorris Professor of Computer Science, Princeton University
- Shadi Bartsch, M.A. 1989, Ph.D. 1991 – Ann L. and Lawrence B. Buttenwieser Professor of Classics, the University of Chicago
- Sally Benson, M.S. 1984, Ph.D. 1988 – Precourt Family Professor, Professor of Energy Resources Engineering and Senior Fellow at the Precourt Institute for Energy and at the Woods Institute for the Environment at Stanford University
- Carolyn Bertozzi, Ph.D. 1993 – T.Z. and Irmgard Chu Distinguished Professor of Chemistry and professor of Molecular and Cell Biology, UC Berkeley
- William B. Bridges, B.S. 1956, M.S. 1957, Ph.D. 1962 – Carl F Braun Professor of Engineering, Emeritus, Caltech
- John Carlstrom, Ph.D. 1988 – Subramanyan Chandrasekhar Distinguished Service Professor of Astrophysics and of Physics, University of Chicago
- Stanley Cavell, B.A. 1947 – Walter M. Cabot Professor Emeritus of Aesthetics and the General Theory of Value, Harvard University
- Sunney I. Chan, B.S. 1957, Ph.D. 1961 – George Grant Hoag Professor of Biophysical Chemistry, Caltech
- Y. Austin Chang, B.S., Ph.D. – Wisconsin Distinguished Professor, University of Wisconsin–Madison
- John H. Cochrane, Ph.D. 1986 – AQR Capital Management Professor of Finance, The University of Chicago Graduate School of Business
- Lizabeth Cohen, M.A. 1981, Ph.D. 1986 – Howard Mumford Jones Professor of American Studies, Department of History, Harvard University
- Randall Collins, Ph.D. 1969 – Dorothy Swaine Thomas Professor in Sociology, University of Pennsylvania
- Dino Di Carlo, B.S. 2002, Ph.D. 2006 – Armond and Elena Hairapetian Professor in Engineering & Medicine, University of California, Los Angeles
- Mircea Dincă, Ph.D. 2008 – W. M. Keck Professor of Energy in the Department of Chemistry, Massachusetts Institute of Technology
- Scott V. Edwards, Ph.D. 1992 – Alexander Agassiz Professor of Organismal and Evolutionary Biology, Harvard University; Curator of Ornithology in the Museum of Comparative Zoology
- Mark C. Elliott, Ph.D. 1993 – Mark Schwartz Professor of Chinese and Inner Asian History, Harvard University, a leader in the "New Qing History"
- Charles Engel, Ph.D. 1983 – Donald Hester Professor of Economics, University of Wisconsin
- Arturo Escobar, Ph.D. 1987 – Kenan Distinguished Professor, Department of Anthropology, University of North Carolina, Chapel Hill
- Paula Findlen, M.A. 1985, Ph.D. 1989 – Ubaldo Pierotti Professor in Italian History, Stanford University
- Robert H. Frank, M.A. 1971, Ph.D. 1972 – Henrietta Johnson Louis Professor of Management and professor of Economics, Cornell University, monthly contributor to the "Economic Scene" column of The New York Times
- Benny D. Freeman, Ph.D. 1988 – Kenneth A. Kobe and Paul D. and Betty Robertson Meek & American Petrofina Foundation Centennial Professor of Chemical Engineering, University of Texas at Austin
- Susan Gal, M.A. 1973, Ph.D. 1976 – Mae & Sidney G. Metzl Distinguished Service Professor of Anthropology and Linguistics, the University of Chicago
- Kristen R. Ghodsee, M.A. 1997, Ph.D. 2002 – John S. Osterweis Associate Professor of Gender and Women's Studies, Bowdoin College
- Jeff Gore, Ph.D. 2005 – Latham Family Career Development Assistant Professor of Physics at MIT
- Bertrand Halperin, Ph.D. 1965 – Hollis Professor of Mathematicks and Natural Philosophy, Emeritus, Harvard University
- James Hanken, A.B. 1973, Ph.D. 1980 – professor of Biology, Alexander Agassiz Professor of Zoology in the Museum of Comparative Zoology, Harvard University
- Mor Harchol-Balter, Ph.D. 1996 – McCandless Associate Professor of Computer Science Carnegie Mellon University
- Deepak Hegde, Ph.D. 2010 – Seymour Milstein Professor of Strategy, New York University Stern School of Business
- Hopi Hoekstra, B.A. 1994 – Edgerley Family Dean of the Faculty of Arts and Sciences and Alexander Agassiz Professor of Zoology, Harvard University
- Patrick L. Holland, Ph.D. 1997 – Conkey P. Whitehead Professor of Chemistry at Yale University
- Marcia Inhorn, M.A. 1985, M.P.H. 1988, Ph.D. 1991 – William K. Lanman Jr. Professor of Anthropology and International Affairs, Yale University
- Erich P. Ippen, M.S. 1965, Ph.D. 1968 – Elihu Thomson Professor of Electrical Engineering Emeritus and professor of Physics emeritus, Massachusetts Institute of Technology
- Eric Jacobsen, Ph.D. 1986 – Sheldon Emery Professor of Chemistry, Harvard University
- Steven Kahn, Ph.D. 1980 – Cassius Lamb Kirk Professor of Natural Sciences and professor of Particle Physics and Astrophysics, Stanford University
- Alice Kaplan, B.A. 1975 – Gilbert, Louis and Edward Lehrman Professor of Romance Studies, Duke University
- Joseph Koerner, Ph.D. 1986 – Victor S. Thomas Professor of the History of Art and Architecture, Harvard University
- Stephen Kotkin, M.A. 1983, Ph.D. 1988 – Rosengarten Professor of Modern and Contemporary History, Princeton University
- Teresa H. Meng, Ph.D. 1988 – co-founder of NASDAQ-listed wireless networking semiconductor company Atheros Communications (acquired by Qualcomm for $3.2 billion); member, National Academy of Engineering, Reid Weaver Dennis Professor of Electrical Engineering at Stanford University, IEEE Fellow
- John Warwick Montgomery, B.L.S., 1954, M.A., 1958 – lawyer, theologian and academic known for his work in the field of Christian apologetics; Distinguished Research Professor of Philosophy and Christian Thought at Patrick Henry College
- Jennifer G. Murphy, Ph.D. 2005 – professor of Chemistry at University of Toronto
- Marion Nestle, B.A. 1959, Ph.D. 1968, M.P.H. 1986 – Paulette Goddard Professor of Nutrition, Food Studies, and Public Health, New York University, author of Food Politics (2002) and Safe Food (2003); Lifetime Achievement Award from the James Beard Foundation, the food industry's highest honor, in 2003
- Ronald Numbers, Ph.D. 1969 – Hilldale and William Coleman Professor of the History of Science and Medicine, University of Wisconsin, Madison
- Eve Ostriker, M.A. 1990, Ph.D. 1993 – Lyman Spitzer, Jr., Professor of Theoretical Astrophysics, Princeton University
- Madhu Pai, Ph.D. in epidemiology is the Canada Research Chair of Epidemiology and Global Health at McGill University
- Nell Irvin Painter, B.A. 1964 – Edwards Professor Emerita of American History, Princeton University
- John F. Hartwig, Ph.D. 1990 – Henry Rapoport Chair in Organic Chemistry, UC Berkeley
- Donald W. Roberts, Ph.D. 1964 – Roy A. Young Scientist Emeritus Chair of Cornell University
- Thomas Sargent, B.A. 1964 – Berkley Professor of Economics and Business, New York University
- William H. Sewell Jr., M.A. 1963, Ph.D. 1971 – Frank P. Hixon Distinguished Service Professor Emeritus of History and Political Science, the University of Chicago
- Paul M. Sniderman, Ph.D. 1972 – Fairleigh S. Dickinson Jr. Professor of Public Policy, Stanford University
- Sidney Tarrow, Ph.D. 1965 – Maxwell Upson Professor of Government and Sociology, Cornell University
- James L. Watson, Ph.D. 1972 – Fairbanks Professor of Chinese Society and professor of Anthropology, Harvard University
- Paul Frederick White, B.S. 1970, Ph.D. 1976, M.D. 1977 – Margaret Milam McDermott Distinguished Chair of Anesthesiology, The University of Texas Southwestern Medical Center
- Rosalind H. Williams, M.A. 1967 – Bern Dibner Professor of the History of Science and Technology, MIT; president, Society for the History of Technology (2005–07)
- Wing Hung Wong, B.A. 1976 – Stephen R. Pierce Family Goldman Sachs Professor in Science and Human Health, Professor of Statistics, professor of Biomedical Data Science, Stanford University
- Robert Wuthnow, Ph.D. 1975 – Gerhard R. Andlinger '52 Professor of Social Sciences and professor of Sociology, Princeton University
- Amnon Yariv, B.S. 1954, M.S. 1956, Ph.D. 1958 – Martin and Eileen Summerfield Professor of Applied Physics and Electrical Engineering, Caltech
- Shing-Tung Yau, Ph.D. 1971 – William Caspar Graustein Professor of Mathematics, Harvard University
- Glennys Young, Ph.D., 1989 – chair, Department of History, University of Washington
- Xiaowei Zhuang, Ph.D. 1996 – David B. Arnold, Jr. Professor of Science, professor of Chemistry and Chemical Biology, Harvard University

== Professors ==
- Odd Aalen, Ph.D. 1976 – professor of Bioscience, University of Oslo
- Christopher Batten (B.S. 1999) – Professor of Computer Engineering at Cornell University
- Scott Aaronson, Ph.D. 2004 – assistant professor of computer science, MIT
- Asad Abidi, M.S. 1978, Ph.D. 1981 – professor of Electrical Engineering at UCLA, member of the National Academy of Engineering
- Irma Adelman, Ph.D. 1955 – Department of Agricultural and Resource Economics, UC Berkeley
- Maynard Amerine, Ph.D. 1935 – professor emeritus of Viticulture and Enology at the University of California, Davis, "made the most singularly significant contributions of any one individual to the California wine industry"
- Özalp Babaoğlu, Ph.D. 1981 – professor of Computer Science, University of Bologna (Italy)
- James David Bales, 1915–1995 (PhD, 1944) – conservative commentator and professor of Christian doctrine at Harding College
- Klaus-Jürgen Bathe, Ph.D. 1971 – pioneer in finite analysis, professor of engineering at MIT
- Richard Beeman, A.B. 1968 – John Walsh Centennial Professor of History, University of Pennsylvania
- Regina Bendix, B.A. 1982 – professor of Cultural Anthropology and European Ethnology, University of Göttingen (Germany)
- Nitza Ben-Dov, Ph.D. 1984 – professor of Hebrew and Comparative Literature, University of Haifa Israel
- Ziva Ben-Porat, Ph.D. – professor of Poetry and Comparative Literature, Tel Aviv University
- Janet Bercovitz, B.S., M.B.A., Ph.D. – professor of Entrepreneurship, Leeds School of Business, University of Colorado Boulder
- João Biehl, Ph.D. 1999 – professor of Anthropology, Princeton University
- Jason Blakely, Ph.D. 2013 – professor of Political Science, Pepperdine University
- Jane M. Bowers, Ph.D. 1971 – associate professor of music at the University of Wisconsin, Milwaukee
- Candy Dawson Boyd, Ph.D. 1982 – director of Reading and Language Arts, Saint Mary's College of California
- Stephen Bronner, Ph.D. 1975 – political theorist, professor, Rutgers University
- Dyke Brown, B.A. 1936 – attorney; assistant dean and assistant professor, Yale Law School; Rhodes Scholar (1936); founder, The Athenian School
- William Craft Brumfield, Ph.D. 1973 – professor of Slavic Studies, Tulane University
- Carlos Bustamante, PhD. 1981 – professor of Physics, Chemistry and Molecular & Cell Biology, UC Berkeley
- Elisabeth Camp, PhD. 2003 – associate professor of Philosophy at Rutgers University
- Sherwin Carlquist, B.A. 1952, Ph.D. 1956 – professor of Botany, Claremont Graduate University and Pomona College
- Charles B. Chang, Ph.D. 2010 – professor of Linguistics, City University of Hong Kong
- George W. Chang, PhD. 1967 – associate professor emeritus of Nutritional Sciences and Toxicology, UC Berkeley
- John J. Clague, M.A. 1969 – emeritus scientist of the Geological Survey of Canada, Professor of Earth Sciences at Simon Fraser UniversityVenkata
- Dalton Conley, B.A. 1990 – university professor of the Social Sciences and professor of Sociology and Public Policy, New York University
- Stephanie Coontz, B.A. 1966 – professor of History and Family Studies at Evergreen State College, author of The Way We Never Were: American Families and the Nostalgia Trap (1992) and Marriage, A Social History (2005)
- Robert Corruccini, Ph.D. 1975 – anthropologist, work on the theory of malocclusion, author, distinguished professor, and Smithsonian Fellow
- LaWanda Cox, Ph.D. 1941 – professor of History, Hunter College, noted historian of slavery and reconstruction
- Michael F. Crommie, Ph.D. 1991 – professor of Physics, UC Berkeley; member of the National Academy of Sciences
- Vincent DiGirolamo, B.A. 1978 – associate professor of History, Baruch College, author of "Crying the News: A History of America's Newsboys" (2019); member of New York Academy of History
- Claudio Donoso, B.S. 1969 – professor of forestry and forest ecology, Universidad Austral de Chile
- Richard S. Elman, Ph.D. 1972 – professor of Mathematics at the University of California, Los Angeles
- Robert D. English, B.A. 1980 – assistant professor of International Relations at the University of Southern California
- Cynthia Enloe, M.A. 1963, Ph.D. 1967 – research professor of International Development and Women's Studies, Clark University
- Amitai Etzioni, Ph.D. 1958 – university professor, George Washington University
- Ben Finney, B.A. 1955 – University of Hawaii professor of anthropology, co-founder of the Polynesian Voyaging Society
- Andrew A. Frank, B.S. 1955, M.S. 1958 – professor of Mechanical and Aeronautical Engineering, UC Davis; the father of modern plug-in hybrid electric vehicles (PHEV)
- John K. Frost, B.S. and M.D. – founding head of the division of Cytopathology at Johns Hopkins University
- John Kenneth Galbraith, Ph.D. 1934 – Paul M. Warburg Professor of Economics at Harvard University, awarded Presidential Medal of Freedom
- Jeff Gore, Ph.D. 2005 – professor of Physics, Massachusetts Institute of Technology
- Ed Guerrero, Ph.D. 1989 (valedictorian) – associate professor of cinema studies and Africana studies at New York University Tisch School of the Arts
- Kenneth J. Hagan, B.A. 1958, M.A. 1964 – professor of History, United States Naval Academy
- Lynne Hanley, Ph.D. – literary critic
- Robert Harvey, B.A. 1972, Ph.D. 1988 – Distinguished Professor, Stony Brook University
- Susanna Hecht, M.A. 1976, Ph.D. 1982 – professor of Urban Planning, UCLA; a founder of "political ecology" approach to forestry; Guggenheim Fellow (2008)
- Hopi Hoekstra, B.A. 1995 – professor of Organismic and Evolutionary Biology and of Molecular and Cellular Biology, Harvard University
- Wesley Newcomb Hohfeld, B.A. 1901 – professor at Stanford and Yale Law Schools, progenitor of the concepts of claim rights and liberty rights and the bundle of rights
- Sally P Horn, Ph.D. 1986 – professor, Department of Geography, University of Tennessee, Knoxville
- John Keith Irwin (1929–2010), Ph.D. – author and professor of sociology at San Francisco State University
- Russell Jeung, M.A 1995, Ph.D. 2000 – professor of Asian American studies at San Francisco State University, co-founder of Stop AAPI Hate
- Chalmers Johnson, B.A. 1953, M.A. 1957, Ph.D. 1961 – author, professor emeritus of the University of California, San Diego, president, and co-founder of the Japan Policy Research Institute
- John Johnson, Ph.D. 2007 – professor of Astronomy, Harvard University
- David Julius, Ph.D. 1983 – recipient of the 2010 Shaw Prize in life science and medicine for "his seminal discoveries of molecular mechanisms by which the skin senses painful stimuli and temperature and produces pain hypersensitivity", professor at the University of California, San Francisco
- Deborah Kamen, Ph.D. 2005 – chair and professor of Classics at the University of Washington
- Steven G. Kellman, M.A. 1969, Ph.D. 1972 – professor of Comparative Literature, University of Texas at San Antonio; film critic; author of Redemption: The Life of Henry Roth (2005) and Perspectives on Raging Bull (1994)
- Vera Kistiakowsky, Ph.D. 1952 – professor of Physics, Emerita, Massachusetts Institute of Technology
- Matthew Kroenig, M.A., Ph.D. – associate professor of Government and Foreign Service and Georgetown University
- Marc Lewis – psychologist, neuroscientist, author, professor at University of Toronto and Radboud University Nijmegen
- Martin C. Libicki – professor at the Frederick S. Pardee RAND Graduate School in Santa Monica, California
- Sharon Lloyd – professor of Philosophy, Law, and Political Science at the University of Southern California
- Clifford Lynch, Ph.D. – formerly with University of California Office of the President; currently director of the Coalition for Networked Information (CNI); adjunct faculty with the UC Berkeley iSchool
- Brian MacWhinney, B.A. 1965, M.A. 1967, Ph.D. 1974 – professor of Psychology, Carnegie Mellon University; leading researcher in the field of language acquisition
- Peter Marcuse, Ph.D. 1972 – professor of Urban Planning, Columbia University, son of Herbert Marcuse
- Yoky Matsuoka, B.S. 1993 – associate professor, Department of Computer Science and Engineering, University of Washington, Seattle; a leader in emerging field of neurobotics, which has led to pioneering developments in rehabilitation and prosthetics; MacArthur Fellow (2007)
- Virginia Matzek – associate professor in Environmental Studies and Sciences at Santa Clara University
- Michael Mitzenmacher, Ph.D. 1996 – professor of Computer Science, Harvard University
- David Benjamin Oppenheimer, B.A. 1972 – clinical professor of law at UC Berkeley School of Law, faculty co-director of the Pro-Bono Program, and director of the UC Berkeley Center on Comparative Equality and Anti-Discrimination Law
- Ann Orel, PhD – professor emerita in chemical engineering at the University of California, Davis and affiliated with the Ultrafast X-Ray Science Laboratory at Lawrence Berkeley National Laboratory
- James Petras, M.A. 1963, Ph.D. 1967 – professor emeritus of Sociology, Binghamton University and political activist
- Marshall Poe, M.A. 1986, Ph.D. 1993 – associate professor of Russian and World History, University of Iowa; co-founder and former editor of academic journal Kritika; author of popular history book Everyone Knows Everything: The Rise of WikiWorld and the Democratization of Knowledge (2008)
- T. Pradeep, Ph.D. 1991 – professor of Chemistry, Indian Institute of Technology Madras, India
- Kristala Jones Prather, Ph.D. 1999 – professor of Chemical Engineering at the Massachusetts Institute of Technology
- Noha Radwan – associate professor of Arabic and comparative literature, University of California, Davis
- Dana Randall, Ph.D., Computer Science, 1994 – professor of Computing and adjunct professor of Mathematics, Georgia Tech
- Gretchen Reydams-Schils, Ph.D, Classics – professor of Liberal Studies at the University of Notre Dame
- Antonius Robben, Ph.D. 1953 – professor of Anthropology at Utrecht University, the Netherlands
- Dylan Rodríguez, Ph.D., Ethnic studies – distinguished professor of Black studies at the University of California, Riverside
- Jed E. Rose, B.A. 1973 – professor in Psychiatry and Behavioral Sciences, Duke University; co-inventor of the nicotine patch; president and CEO of the Rose Research Center
- Josiah Royce, B.A. 1875 – philosopher, professor at Harvard University
- Allison Sekuler, Ph.D. Neuroscience, Canada Research Chair in Cognitive Neuroscience at McMaster University
- Srinivasan Seshan, B.S. 1990, Ph.D. 1995 – associate professor of Computer Science, Carnegie Mellon University
- Kevin Sivula, Ph.D. 2007 – professor of molecular engineering, EPFL
- Richard Stratt, Ph. D. 1979 – professor of physical chemistry at Brown University
- Susan Stryker, Ph.D. 1992 – associate professor of Gender and Women's Studies at the University of Arizona
- Deborah Tannen, M.A. 1976, Ph.D. 1979 – professor of Linguistics, Georgetown University
- Carl E. Thoresen, B.A. 1955 – professor of Education, and by Courtesy, Psychology, and Psychiatry (emeritus) at Stanford University
- Yi-Fu Tuan, Ph.D. 1957 – professor emeritus of Geography, University of Wisconsin, Madison
- Edith Brown Weiss, Ph.D. – professor of law at Georgetown University and former president of the American Society of International Law
- France Winddance Twine, Ph.D. 1995 – professor of Sociology, University of California Santa Barbara
- Wayne S. Vucinich, B.A. 1936, M.A. 1937, Ph.D. 1941 – a "founding father" of Russian and East European Studies, professor of History, Stanford University
- Grace Wang B.S. – sustainability scholar at Western Washington University; former department chair
- Ray Wolfinger, BA – professor of political science at UC Berkeley
- Jenny Y. Yang, BS – assistant professor of chemistry, University of California, Irvine
- David Zuckerman, Ph.D. 1991 – professor of Computer Science, University of Texas at Austin

== See also ==
- List of University of California, Berkeley faculty
- UC Berkeley School of Law
