= Derby dell'Emilia =

Football derby

- Bologna FC 1909 Parma Calcio 1913
- Other names: Emilia Derby
- Location: Italy
- First meeting: 18 November 1983; Serie C1; Parma 3–3 Bologna
- Latest meeting: 8 February 2026; Serie A Bologna 0–1 Parma

Statistics
- Total meetings: 52
- Most wins: Bologna (16)
- All-time series: Bologna: 16; Draws: 22; Parma: 14
- Largest victory: Bologna 4–1 Parma (Serie A; 12 May 2019 and Serie A; 28 September 2020); Parma 0–3 Bologna; Serie A; 7 February 2021)

The Derby dell'Emilia (Italian pronunciation: [ˈdɛrbi delleˈmiːlja]; "Emilia Derby") is the name given in football to any match between Bologna and Parma. It is named after the historical region making up the western and north-eastern portions of Emilia-Romagna, where the cities of Parma and Bologna are located. The derby is contested twice a year when the two clubs participate in the same league competition, such as Serie A, and more often if the clubs meet in other competitions. Other matches between Emilian teams may also be referred to under the name Derby dell'Emilia.

The rivalry comes about as Parma and Bologna are the two largest cities in Emilia-Romagna and the two clubs are the two most successful football clubs in the region, although Reggiana and Modena, respectively, are seen as the clubs' two closest rivals. Bologna lead the count in official titles won, with ten major trophies (plus an Intertoto Cup and three Mitropa Cups), while Parma have won eight trophies.

== History ==
Locations of Bologna and Parma in Italy

For much of the clubs' early history, games were not contested, so the first fixture was not until 6 November 1983, despite Bologna being formed in 1909 and Parma just four years later in 1913. While Bologna competed for titles, becoming national champions 7 times and winning the Coppa Italia twice by 1974, Parma only dreamt of national success. The first meeting was an eventful 3–3 draw at the Stadio Ennio Tardini in what remains the fixture's highest scoring game and the lowest level at which it has been fought. March's return also saw no victor; it was a goalless draw. The rivalry was intensified because both sides were competing for the 1983–84 Serie C1 title. Indeed, the duo each finished joint top with 48 points and achieved promotion to Serie B.

Serie B was the scene for six more derbies before the decade was out and 1985 saw the clubs' only battle in the Coppa Italia: a 0–0 draw that eventually consigned both sides to failure to qualify from the group stage. Bologna's win (their first derby victory at the eighth attempt) and a draw and thus 3 points earned against Parma were crucial in their 1988 Serie B title win. In 1990, the derby was contested in Serie A for the first time, after Parma joined Bologna in Italian football's top tier. It was now Parma who had the upper hand, with Bologna relegated in the spring of 1991. The teams would not meet again until Bologna's return to Serie A in 1996, but then proceeded to play each other on an annual basis for nine consecutive years.

The final season of that run, 2004–05, was the rivalry at its zenith. Both sides had performed poorly, finishing 17th and 18th in the 20-strong league. The bottom three sides were to be relegated and to split the two Emilian sides, the traditional spareggio was required, involving a two-legged play-off to decide which of the two would remain in Serie A. Bologna won the first leg in the Stadio Ennio Tardini 1–0 on 14 June 2005, but succumbed to 2–1 aggregate defeat following Parma's two-goal victory in Bologna, securing the Crociati a place in Italy's top division.

In 2008, Bologna achieved promotion back to Serie A, but Parma dropped down to Serie B, so the teams did not meet again until the following year. In 2009–10, both teams managed 2–1 wins at home, preceding a three-match run of goalless draws, a result that occurred for the tenth time in the 36 meetings up to that point.

== Statistics ==
As of 8 February 2026, there have been 52 competitive meetings between the teams. Bologna has won 16 of these, Parma has won 14, and the remaining 22 matches have finished as draws. The biggest victory happened on 12 May 2019 and on 28 September 2020 when Bologna earned a 4–1 victory; another victory with a margin of three goals has happened on 7 February 2021, when Bologna won 3–0. Other than that, seven times the match has been decided with a margin of two goals. Bologna has achieved this margin of victory twice, both times winning in 3–1 at home in Serie A. Parma have won by a two-goal margin on five occasions, three times at home and twice away, including the spareggio victory in 2005.

Competition	Bologna wins	Draws	Parma wins	Bologna goals	Parma goals
League	14	21	13	54	47
Coppa Italia	1	1	0	2	1
Other	1	0	1	1	2
Total	16	22	14	57	50

== Honours ==
Bologna and Parma are the only teams in Emilia-Romagna to have won major titles. Bologna won the first of their seven league titles in 1924–25 and their latest major silverware was the 2024–25 Coppa Italia; Parma's most recent major title was the 2001–02 Coppa Italia.

Team	League	Coppa Italia	Supercoppa Italiana	UEFA Cup	Cup Winners' Cup	European Super Cup	Total
Bologna	7	3	0	0	0	0	10
Parma	0	3	1	2	1	1	8
Combined	7	6	1	2	1	1	18

== All-time results ==
Parma win Draw Bologna win

=== Bologna at home ===
Date	Venue	Score	Competition
18 March 1984	Stadio Renato Dall'Ara	0–0	Serie C1
4 November 1984	Stadio Renato Dall'Ara	1–1	Serie B
30 November 1986	Stadio Renato Dall'Ara	0–0	Serie B
25 October 1987	Stadio Renato Dall'Ara	3–1	Serie B
14 April 1991	Stadio Renato Dall'Ara	1–3	Serie A
12 January 1997	Stadio Renato Dall'Ara	0–1	Serie A
1 March 1998	Stadio Renato Dall'Ara	1–2	Serie A
4 October 1998	Stadio Renato Dall'Ara	0–0	Serie A
30 January 2000	Stadio Renato Dall'Ara	1–0	Serie A
19 November 2000	Stadio Renato Dall'Ara	2–1	Serie A
16 September 2001	Stadio Renato Dall'Ara	1–0	Serie A
14 December 2002	Stadio Renato Dall'Ara	2–1	Serie A
31 August 2003	Stadio Renato Dall'Ara	2–2	Serie A
3 February 2005	Stadio Renato Dall'Ara	3–1	Serie A
18 June 2005	Stadio Renato Dall'Ara	0–2	Relegation play-off
25 April 2010	Stadio Renato Dall'Ara	2–1	Serie A
8 May 2011	Stadio Renato Dall'Ara	0–0	Serie A
22 January 2012	Stadio Renato Dall'Ara	0–0	Serie A
22 December 2012	Stadio Renato Dall'Ara	1–2	Serie A
13 April 2014	Stadio Renato Dall'Ara	1–1	Serie A
13 May 2019	Stadio Renato Dall'Ara	4–1	Serie A
24 November 2019	Stadio Renato Dall'Ara	2–2	Serie A
28 September 2020	Stadio Renato Dall'Ara	4–1	Serie A
6 October 2024	Stadio Renato Dall'Ara	0–0	Serie A
4 December 2025	Stadio Renato Dall'Ara	2–1	Coppa Italia
8 February 2026	Stadio Renato Dall'Ara	0–1	Serie A

Bologna wins	Parma wins	Draws	Bologna goals	Parma goals
10	6	10	33	25

=== Parma at home ===
Date	Venue	Score	Competition
18 November 1983	Stadio Ennio Tardini	3–3	Serie C1
31 March 1985	Stadio Ennio Tardini	1–0	Serie B
1 September 1985	Stadio Ennio Tardini	0–0	Coppa Italia
3 May 1987	Stadio Ennio Tardini	2–0	Serie B
27 March 1988	Stadio Ennio Tardini	0–0	Serie B
9 December 1990	Stadio Ennio Tardini	1–1	Serie A
25 May 1997	Stadio Ennio Tardini	1–0	Serie A
19 October 1997	Stadio Ennio Tardini	2–0	Serie A
14 February 1999	Stadio Ennio Tardini	1–1	Serie A
12 September 1999	Stadio Ennio Tardini	1–1	Serie A
1 April 2001	Stadio Ennio Tardini	0–0	Serie A
26 January 2002	Stadio Ennio Tardini	2–1	Serie A
3 May 2003	Stadio Ennio Tardini	1–2	Serie A
25 January 2004	Stadio Ennio Tardini	0–0	Serie A
22 September 2004	Stadio Ennio Tardini	1–2	Serie A
14 June 2005	Stadio Ennio Tardini	0–1	Relegation play-off
13 December 2009	Stadio Ennio Tardini	2–1	Serie A
19 December 2010	Stadio Ennio Tardini	0–0	Serie A
13 May 2012	Stadio Ennio Tardini	1–0	Serie A
12 May 2013	Stadio Ennio Tardini	0–2	Serie A
30 November 2013	Stadio Ennio Tardini	1–1	Serie A
22 December 2018	Stadio Ennio Tardini	0–0	Serie A
12 July 2020	Stadio Ennio Tardini	2–2	Serie A
7 February 2021	Stadio Ennio Tardini	0–3	Serie A
22 February 2025	Stadio Ennio Tardini	2–0	Serie A
2 November 2025	Stadio Ennio Tardini	1–3	Serie A

Parma wins	Bologna wins	Draws	Parma goals	Bologna goals
8	6	12	25	24

== Shared personnel ==
=== Players ===
A number of players have played for both clubs over the course of their careers. This is an incomplete list of players who have made at least one appearance for both:

- (Brazil) Adaílton
- (Italy) Fabio Albinelli
- (Ghana) Stephen Appiah
- (Italy) Mattia Bani
- (Italy) Franco Battisodo
- (Algeria) Ishak Belfodil
- (Italy) Corrado Bernicchi
- (Italy) Stefano Bettarini
- (Italy) Giovanni Bia
- (Italy) Massimo Brambilla
- (Italy) Matteo Brighi
- (Italy) Giuseppe Cardone
- (Italy) Marcello Castellini
- (Italy) Tarcisio Catanese
- (Italy) Pierluigi Di Già
- (Italy) Dino Di Carlo
- (Italy) Marco Di Vaio
- (Italy) Luciano Facchini
- (Italy) Giulio Falcone
- (Italy) Marco Ferrante
- (Italy) Emanuele Filippini
- (Italy) Davide Fontolan
- (Italy) Alberto Gilardino
- (Italy) Federico Giunti
- (Italy) Manfredo Grandi
- (Italy) Cristiano Lupatelli
- (Italy) Marco Macina
- (Italy) Giampiero Maini
- (Italy) Amedeo Mangone
- (Italy) Marco Marocchi
- (Italy) Carlo Matteucci
- (Italy) Francesco Modesto
- (Italy) Giacomo Murelli
- (Japan) Hidetoshi Nakata
- (Italy) Renato Olive
- (Italy) Daniele Paponi
- (Italy) Angelo Pilati
- (Italy) Andrea Pisanu
- (Italy) Giuseppe Pomati
- (Italy) Matteo Rubin
- (Italy) Pietro Strada
- (Italy) Stefano Torrisi
- (Italy) Francesco Valiani
- (Italy) Paolo Vanoli
- (Italy) Daniele Vantaggiato
- (Italy) Rufo Emiliano Verga
- (Italy) Fabio Vignaroli
- (Italy) Cristian Zaccardo

=== Managers ===
Six coaches have managed both Bologna and Parma. Renzo Ulivieri, who lasted less than a year at Parma, has managed Bologna in three spells. Francesco Guidolin took charge of Bologna for 4 years at the turn of the millennium, before leading Parma to promotion from Serie B in 2009 and an impressive return to Serie A in 2009–10. Three of Bologna's last four managers have also managed Parma: Franco Colomba, Alberto Malesani (who won the 1998–99 UEFA Cup, the 1998–99 Coppa Italia and the 1999 Supercoppa Italiana with Parma) and recent Bologna boss Stefano Pioli. Former Bologna head coach Roberto Donadoni coached Parma for three and a half years and 141 matches.

Name	Bologna	Parma
Name	Period	Period
(Italy) Renzo Ulivieri	1994–1998; 2005; 2006–2007	2001
(Italy) Francesco Guidolin	1999–2003	2008–2010
(Italy) Franco Colomba	2009–2010	2011–2012
(Italy) Alberto Malesani	2010–2011	1998–2001
(Italy) Stefano Pioli	2011–2014	2006–2007
(Italy) Roberto Donadoni	2015–2018	2012–2015

== Other Emilian derbies ==
Because the terms derby dell'Emilia and derby emiliano simply mean "Emilian derby", any number of other matches could also be referred to under the same name, although the contest between Parma and Bologna is most often implied because they are the region's two biggest most successful clubs and the Derby della via Emilia is often preferred as a name for other Emilian derbies.

The six of Emilia-Romagna's 9 provinces that roughly correspond to the historic region of Emilia are Piacenza, Parma, Reggio Emilia, Modena, Bologna and Ferrara. Other than Parma and Bologna, 4 other clubs had participated in Serie A until 2018: Piacenza, Reggiana, Modena and SPAL. The promotion of Reggiana and Piacenza to Serie A in 1993 meant that each of the 6 Emilian provinces had had one team in Italian football's top division since its foundation in 1929; SPAL is based in Ferrara. In 2013 and 2015 respectively, Sassuolo and Carpi (both based in the Modena province) secured promotion having won the Serie B title. Parma was the only Emilian club to have played in Serie A without ever having won a Serie B league title before their triumph in the 2023–24 season.

Sassuolo's rise gave its match against Modena added significance. Sassuolo played in the third tier of Italian football for the first time in 2006 and made its Serie B debut in 2008. Promotion to Serie B in 2008 meant the club had outgrown the Stadio Enzo Ricci, so it moved to the nearby Stadio Alberto Braglia, Modena's ground. Promotion to Serie A in 2013 preceded a move to the Stadio Città del Tricolore in Reggio Emilia, Reggiana's home ground.

Other Emilian derbies often take different names. For example:

- Derby dei Ducati – Modena vs Parma
- Derby del Ducato – Parma vs Piacenza
- Derby dell'Enza (or Derby del Grana) – Parma vs Reggiana
- Derby della Ghirlandina – Modena vs Sassuolo
