= MaterialCenter =

- Developer(s): MSC Software Corp. (MSC)
- Operating system: Linux and Microsoft Windows
- Type: Data Management Software
- License: Proprietary Software
- Website: www.mscsoftware.com/product/materialcenter

MaterialCenter is a materials data management system designed to capture data from integrated processes for traceability across the enterprise during the entire product life cycle. It serves as the single point of entry for materials related activities such as physical test data entry and reduction, multi-scale materials modeling, approval work flow, and the export of simulation ready data to analysis. MaterialCenter supports commercial CAE products including MSC Nastran, MSC Fatigue, Marc, and e-Xstream Digimat.

== See also ==
- MSC Software
