= HyperX and HyperSizer Software =

Computer-aided engineering software

HyperSizer
- Developer: Collier Research Corporation (now known as Collier Aerospace)
- Stable release: 8.0.58
- Operating system: Windows 7, Windows 8, Windows 10
- Type: Design & Analysis software
- License: Commercial
- Website: www.hypersizer.com

HyperSizer is a computer-aided engineering (CAE) software used for stress analysis and sizing optimization of metallic and composite structures. Originally developed at the US National Aeronautics and Space Administration (NASA) as ST-SIZE, it was licensed for commercial use by Collier Research Corporation (now known as Collier Aerospace) in 1996. Additional proprietary code was added and the software was marketed under the name HyperSizer.

HyperSizer was succeeded by HyperX in 2022, which was originally developed at NASA Langley and was licensed for commercial use by Collier Research Corporation in 1996.

== History ==
=== HyperSizer ===
HyperSizer was developed from the NASA Langley Research Center (LaRC) ST-SIZE research code. ST-SIZE was originally developed because NASA identified a need for accurate methods of formulating panel stiffness and thermal expansion coefficients, leading to the development of ST-SIZE from 1988 to 1995. Another need was the reduction of mass on high-speed aircraft and weight reduction for optimization. ST-SIZE was developed by a team of engineers working on the National Aerospace Plane X-30. Two major versions of ST-SIZE were created. The original version included formulations for stiffness terms and thermal expansion coefficients based on approximations often taken in traditional design methods. In 1990, a version of ST-SIZE was formed for structural design and weight prediction. A new method for formulation of stiffened panel properties was developed starting in 1991. A method for including composite lamina and laminate data in the formulation of stiffened panel structural properties was first developed. Thermal coefficients were created to handle both in-plane and through-the-thickness temperature gradients for membrane, bending, and membrane-bending coupling. A method was then developed to enter these thermal expansion and bending coefficients into the MSC Software version of Nastran for finite element analysis (FEA) using a model with a single plane of finite elements. Other solvers are supported such as I-DEAS.

In May 1996, Collier Research Corporation was formed in Hampton, Virginia from the original ST-SIZE design team, which included Craig S. Collier. Collier Research obtained an exclusive, all-fields-of-use license, and became the first company to license NASA software for commercial use. They combined the NASA LaRC ST-SIZE copyright research code with other company proprietary software; the combined software became HyperSizer.

=== HyperX ===
HyperX
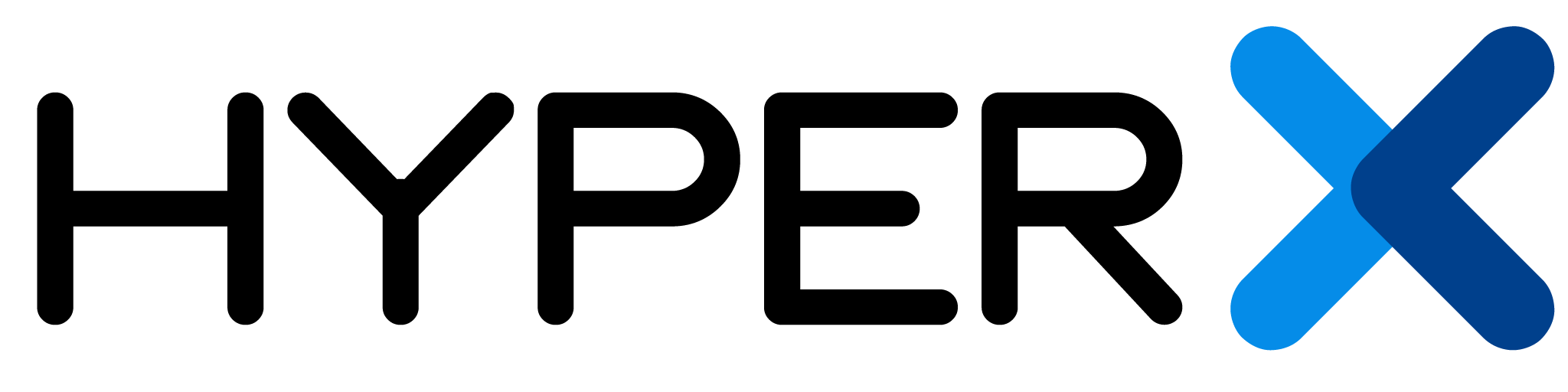
- Developer: Collier Aerospace (aka Collier Research Corporation)
- Stable release: 2025.1.4
- Operating system: Windows 8, Windows 10, Windows 11
- Type: Design and analysis software
- License: Commercial
- Website: collieraerospace.com

HyperSizer developed from the NASA Langley Research Center (LaRC) ST-SIZE research code. ST-SIZE was originally developed because NASA identified a need for accurate methods of formulating panel stiffness and thermal expansion coefficients, leading to the development of ST-SIZE from 1988 to 1995. Another need was the reduction of mass on high-speed aircraft and weight reduction for optimization. ST-SIZE was developed by a team of engineers working on the National Aerospace Plane X-30.

Two major versions of ST-SIZE were created. The original version included formulations for stiffness terms and thermal expansion coefficients based on approximations often taken in traditional design methods. In 1990, a version of ST-SIZE was formed for structural design and weight prediction. A new method for formulation of stiffened panel properties was developed starting in 1991. A method for including composite lamina and laminate data in the formulation of stiffened panel structural properties was first developed. Thermal coefficients were created to handle both in-plane and through-the-thickness temperature gradients for membrane, bending, and membrane-bending coupling. A method was then developed to enter these thermal expansion and bending coefficients into the MSC Software version of Nastran for finite element analysis (FEA) using a model with a single plane of finite elements.

In May 1996, Collier Research Corporation was formed in Hampton, Virginia from the original ST-SIZE design team, which included Craig S. Collier. Collier Research obtained an exclusive, all-fields-of-use license, and became the first company to license NASA software for commercial use. They combined the NASA LaRC ST-SIZE copyright research code with other company proprietary software; the combined software became HyperSizer.

== Uses ==
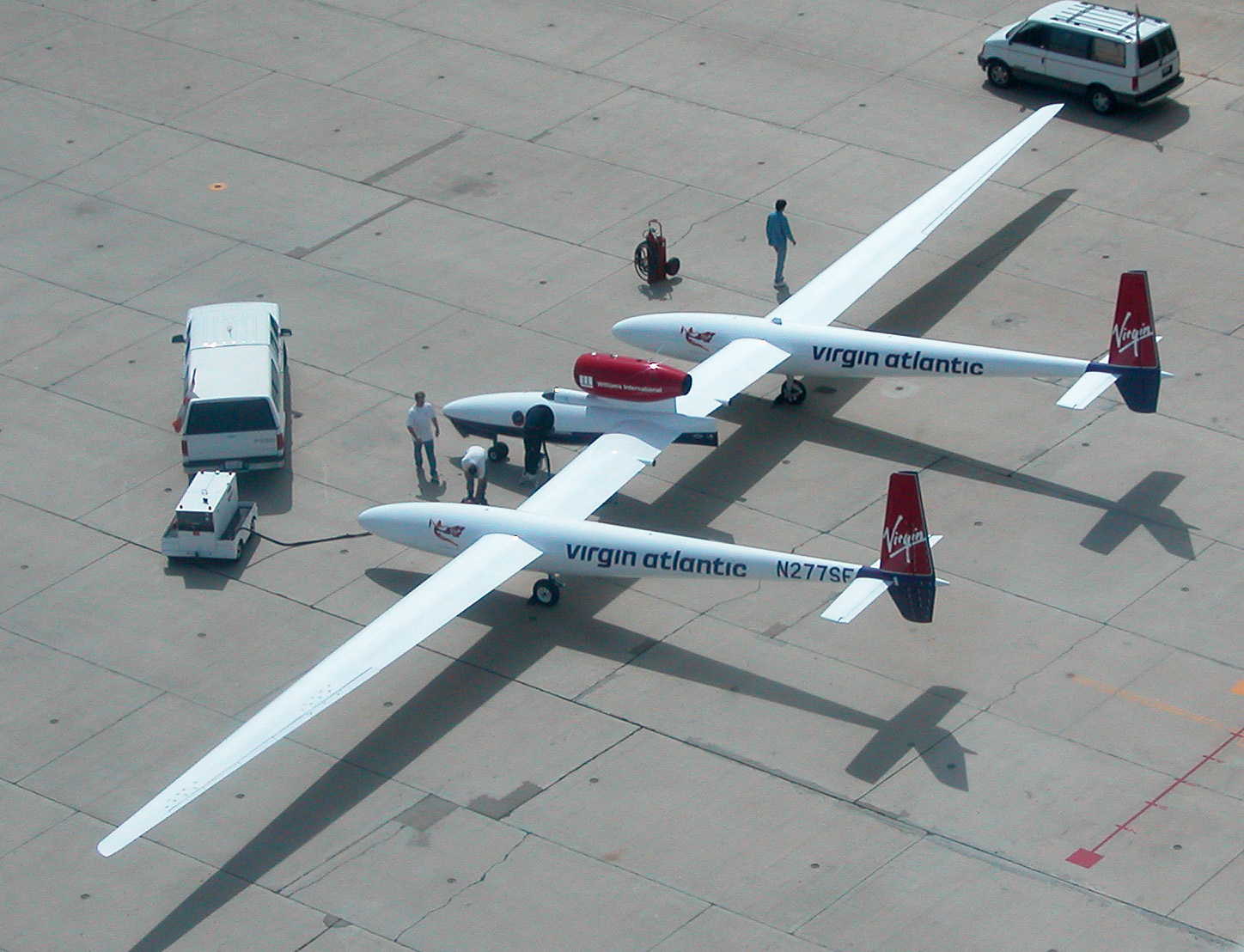
Hypersizer was used to design the GlobalFlyer.

Commercial customers use HyperSizer software to design and analyze composite material and metallic structures. For example, the wind turbine design industry uses the program to design 100-meter long blades that are light and manufacturable.

Beginning with the NASA astronaut Composite Crew Module (CCM) of the Orion spacecraft, the CSeries and Learjet 85 of Bombardier Aerospace, HyperSizer has seen use on projects that are primarily or entirely composite structures. The record-setting Scaled Composites GlobalFlyer was designed with the help of Hypersizer, as well as the Lunar Atmosphere and Dust Environment Explorer.

Earlier codes were originally intended for weight prediction but evolved into ones that were able to assess structural integrity and find optimum sizes and materials. HyperSizer Version 6.1, released in May 2011, contains an integrated suite of failure analysis predictions verified by test data. New capabilities optimize manufacturing. Capabilities have been added to include: macromechanics, micromechanics, failure mode and effects analysis, panel concepts, composite optimization, and integration with Abaqus FEA software.

There are two available versions of HyperSizer, Pro and Express. Both HyperSizer Pro and Express can equally analyze and design laminates and sandwich panels, and update the FEM, and report margins. HyperSizer Express (released in 2016) delivers key capabilities of HyperSizer Pro in a user-friendly packaged aimed at the composite engineer. While HyperSizer Pro specializes in aerospace and space launch, applications for Express include automotive, sporting goods, medical, industrial, and marine.

Instead, HyperX is used to perform structural analysis and weight optimization for metallic and composite vehicles. Use cases for HyperX include the SP80 kite-powered carbon fiber racing sailboat, the Naval Architecture and Ocean Engineering at Hongik University in South Korea and Samwon Millennia, Inc. natural fiber composite wind turbine blade, and a carbon fiber e-bike case study performed by Flanders Make and 4RealSim.

== Details ==
HyperSizer is written in Fortran and Visual Basic and contains over 400,000 lines of code. The software is compatible with Microsoft Windows 7, Windows 8, and Windows 10. Version 6.1 (released in May 2011) integrated with FEA solvers in an iterative loop conducting trade studies and examining potential design candidates. HyperSizer ensures structural integrity through failure analyses. It increases manufacturability by minimizing ply drops, identifying laminate transition add/drop boundaries, and defining ply shapes. HyperSizer competes in the analysis and sizing software market with Firehole Composites, ESI, and ESAComp among others. HyperSizer Pro was rated first in the "tools of the month" by Desktop Engineering magazine in July 2011. HyperSizer Express was named "Editor's Pick" by Desktop Engineering in March 2016.

HyperX is written in C# code, which operates on SQL relational database tables. It is compatible on the Windows 8, Windows 10, and Windows 11 operating systems.
