= Duttal =

- Village
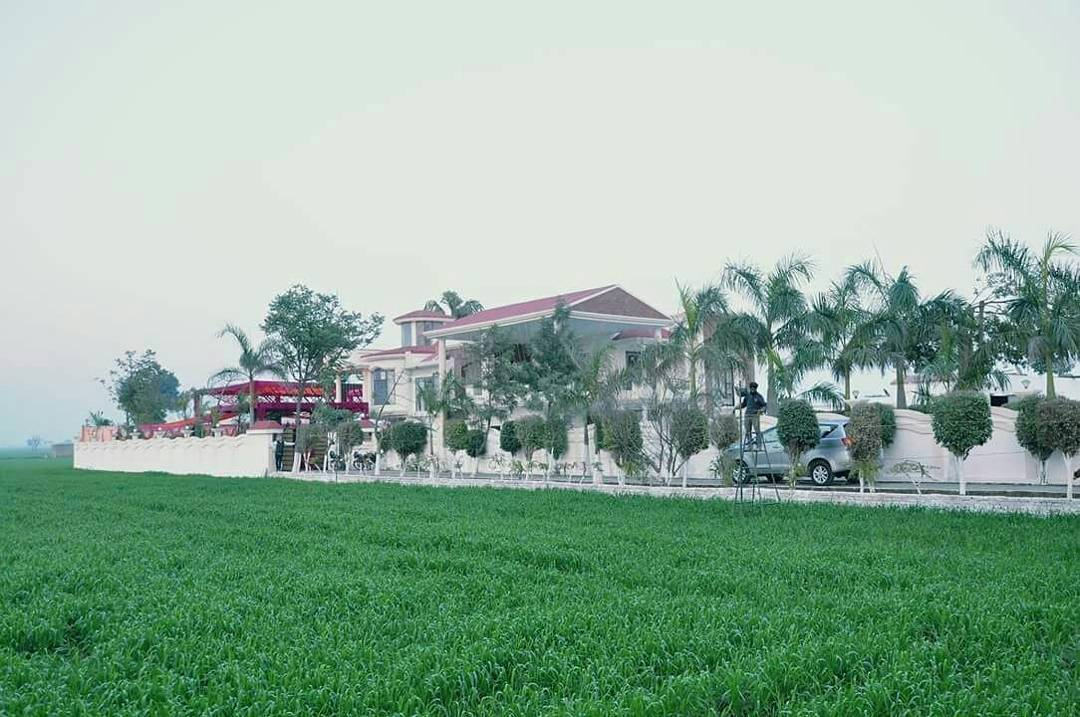
- Duttal village

- Location within Punjab Location within India
- Coordinates: 29°56′08″N 76°05′37″E
- Country: India
- State: Punjab
- District: Patiala
- Tehsil: Patran

Government
  - Assembly MLA: Nirmal Singh
  - Parliament MP: Dr. Dharam Vira Gandhi
- Time zone: UTC+5:30 (IST)
- Postal code: 147105

Duttal is a village in Punjab of northern India, located at the edge of Patiala district.

== Geography ==
The area is suitable for farming as is the case in all of Punjab and has an average elevation of 250 meters (820 feet).
