= Collier Aerospace =

Software company in Virginia, US

- Formerly: Collier Research and Development Corporation
- Type: Private
- Industry: Space launch vehicles; reusable rockets; commercial airframes; business jets; eVTOLs; high-performance composites
- Founded: February 10, 1995
- Founder: Craig Collier; Ivonne Collier
- Headquarters: Newport News, Virginia
- Number of locations: 3 Offices
- Products: HyperX Software
- Services: Engineering Services
- Number of employees: 55
- Website: collieraerospace.com

Collier Aerospace (formerly known as Collier Research and Development Corporation) is an engineering software company headquartered in Newport News, Virginia. Collier Aerospace develops HyperX, a computer-aided engineering (CAE) software which provides engineers with an automated framework to perform classical, industry-standard aerospace failure analyses with margin-of-safety reporting for metal and composite airframes.

== History ==
Collier Aerospace got its start as a research team at the NASA Langley Research Center (LaRC). This team worked on a research code, ST-SIZE, whose purpose was to provide accurate methods of formulating panel stiffness and thermal expansion coefficients. This code was in development from 1988 to 1995.

In May 1996, Collier Aerospace was formed in Hampton, Virginia from the original ST-SIZE design team, which included Craig S. Collier. Collier Aerospace obtained an exclusive, all-fields-of-use license, and became the first company to license NASA software for commercial use. They combined the NASA LaRC ST-SIZE copyright research code with other company proprietary software; the combined software became HyperSizer.

2019 was also when Collier Aerospace expanded its global footprint by founding a GmbH in Augsburg, Germany. In 2021, Collier Aerospace opened its third office location in Raleigh, North Carolina.

== Portfolio ==
Projects Collier Aerospace provided software and engineering services for include:

- NASA Ares V heavy-lift launch vehicle,
- NASA Composite Crew Module (CCM),
- Bombardier Learjet 85,
- Orion Multi-Purpose Crew Vehicle (MPCV) heat shield,
- Ames Research Center Lunar Atmosphere Dust Environment Explorer (LADEE),
- Bell-V280 tiltrotor fuselage,
- Scaled Composites Stratolaunch,
- Sierra Space Dream Chaser,
- NASA Hi-Rate Composite Aircraft Manufacturing (HiCAM) project,
- Naval Architecture and Ocean Engineering at Hongik University in South Korea and Samwon Millennia, Inc. natural fiber composite wind turbine blade,
- SP80 kite-powered racing sailboat,
- Radia WindRunner,
- and Lockheed Martin X-59 Quesst nosecone.
