= NEi Fusion =

- Servo Motor with In-Flight Loading Modeled in NEi Fusion with NEi Nastran
- Developer: NEi Software
- Operating system: Windows XP, Windows Vista
- Type: Computer aided engineering
- Website: www.neisoftware.com

NEi Fusion is a finite element analysis program sold by NEi Software that is used by engineers to build and analyze 3D models of parts and assemblies of various products. NEi Fusion digital-simulation software virtually applies forces, pressures, vibration, acceleration loads, or thermal conditions to 3D models of parts, structures, and assemblies. It obtains results of various engineering parameters, such as deformation, stresses, strains, temperature distributions, and modal shapes the design would experience if implemented. The results, which range from tables of data to contour plots and animations, provide engineering insight. For example, result visualizations like color-coded, contour plots can help deepen understanding of physical phenomena in complex geometry. NEi Fusion consists of a 3D parametric CAD modeler powered by SolidWorks with NEi Nastran finite element analysis solvers. NEi Fusion runs on Microsoft Windows and provides CAD modeling, import and meshing tools.

== Applications ==
Finite element analysis software is typically used to improve the engineering design process by identifying potential problem areas, reducing development man-hours by eliminating portions of costly prototyping and testing. It can spur innovation by allowing a way to evaluate different designs and materials, and providing a tool for optimizing designs early in the development cycle.

== Present day ==
NEi Fusion 2.1, was released in February 2010. It now includes the following enhancements:

- Thermal stress
- Nonlinear transient response
- Variable loading
- XY plot enhancements
- Beam/Bar enhancements
- Automated bolted joints
- Failure theories
- Tree simplification enhancement
- Multi-surface contact surface selection.
