= Learjet 85 =

Learjet development program

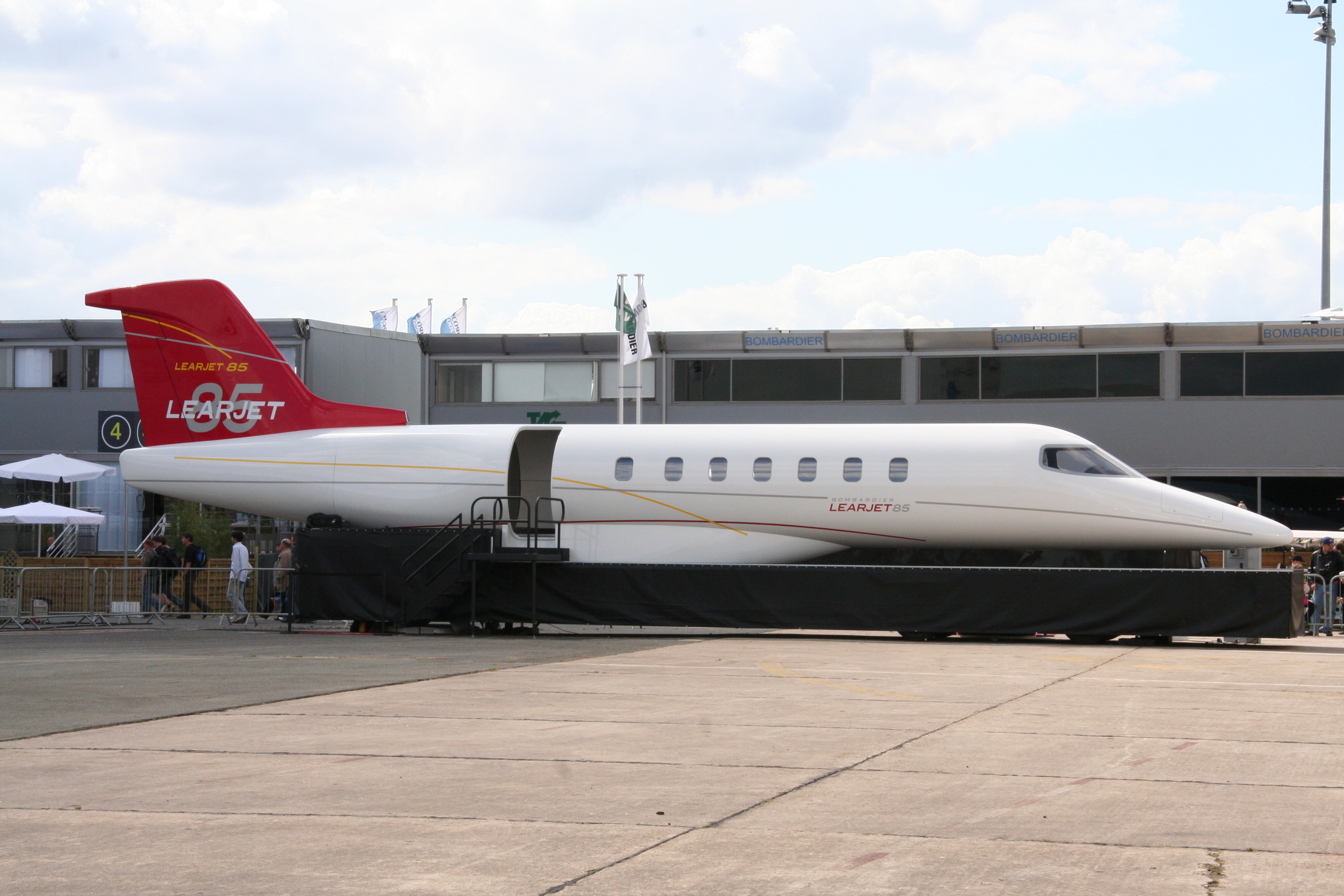
- Bombardier Learjet 85 mockup at Paris Air Show 2009

General information
- Type: Business jet
- Manufacturer: Bombardier
- Status: Cancelled
- Number built: 2

History
- First flight: 9 April 2014

The Learjet 85 was a Learjet development program by aircraft manufacturer Bombardier Aerospace.

The program was launched on October 30, 2007 and a mockup of the aircraft was unveiled in October 2008 at the NBAA show in Orlando. The Learjet 85 was to fit between the midsize and the super midsize segments of the market. Designed for type certification under FAR-25, it was the first Bombardier Aerospace business jet to feature a composite structure. The plane was intended to have a high-speed cruise of Mach 0.82 and a transcontinental range of up to 3,000 nautical miles (5,600 km). The program was cancelled in 2015.

== Design and development ==
Computer software design tools were used on the project, including CATIA and HyperSizer, and similar wing technology employed as on the Bombardier CSeries.

Bombardier reported nearly 60 Learjet 85 orders at a price of US$17.2 million (2008 dollars). Flexjet announced it would be the initial launch customer with seven orders in 2011.

On October 21, 2010, Bombardier opened a Learjet 85 aircraft component manufacturing facility in Querétaro, Mexico. The plant was inaugurated by President Felipe Calderón. Some parts of the wing would have been manufactured in Belfast in Northern Ireland.

The first test flight was on 9 April 2014.

On January 15, 2015, Bombardier announced their decision to suspend the Learjet 85 program and cut 1000 associated jobs.

On October 29, 2015, Bombardier chief executive Alain Bellemare announced a 2015 $4.9 billion third quarter loss, including the cancellation of the Learjet 85 program. The company suspended the Learjet 85 to concentrate on the CSeries and Global 7000/8000 instead.

== Specifications (Learjet 85) ==
Data from Bombardier

General characteristics

- Crew: two
- Capacity: eight passengers
- Length: 20.76 m (68 ft 1 in)
- Wingspan: 18.75 m (61 ft 6 in)
- Height: 6.08 m (19 ft 11 in)
- Wing area: 37.25 m^{2} (401.0 sq ft)
- Empty weight: 10,977 kg (24,200 lb)
- Max takeoff weight: 15,195 kg (33,500 lb)
- Powerplant: 2 × Pratt & Whitney PW307B turbofans

Performance

- Maximum speed: 871 km/h (541 mph, 470 kn)
- Cruise speed: 829 km/h (515 mph, 448 kn)
- Range: 4,800 km (3,000 mi, 2,600 nmi)
- Service ceiling: 15,000 m (49,000 ft)

Avionics

- Rockwell Collins Pro Line Fusion avionics suite
- Electronic Flight Instrument System (EFIS)
- Inertial Reference System (IRS)
- Integrated Flight Information System (IFIS) with electronic charts
- Two Electronic Flight Bag (EFB)
- Synthetic Vision System for Situational Awareness (SVS)
- Terrain Awareness and Warning System (TAWS)
- Dual Flight Management System (FMS)
- Surface Awareness System
- Weather Radar System
- Autothrottle
- Wide Area Augmentation System (WAAS)
