= NEi Nastran =

NEi Software Products
- SpaceShipOne motor bulkhead analyzed in NEi Nastran
- Developer(s): NEi Software
- Stable release: V10.2 / 2013
- Operating system: Windows XP, Linux
- Type: Computer Aided Engineering (CAE) software
- Website: www.NEiSoftware.com

Example of NEi Nastran analysis result.

NEi Nastran was an engineering analysis and simulation software product of NEi Software (formerly known as Noran Engineering, Inc.). Based on NASA's Structural Analysis program NASTRAN, the software is a finite element analysis (FEA) solver used to generate solutions for linear and nonlinear stress, dynamics, and heat transfer characteristics of structures and mechanical components. NEi Nastran software is used with all major industry pre- and post-processors, including Femap, a product of Siemens PLM Software, and the in-house brands NEi Nastran in-CAD, NEi Fusion, and NEi Works for SolidWorks. This software was acquired by Autodesk in May 2014.

== History ==
The original NASTRAN program came out of NASA's need to develop a common generic structural analysis program that would be used by all of the centers supporting the space program. A specification was written and a contract was awarded to Computer Sciences Corporation for the development of NAsa STRuctural ANalysis (NASTRAN) software. NASTRAN was released to NASA in 1968.

== Improvements ==
In the late 1960s, Finite Element Analysis software was confined to running on expensive mainframe computers, and highly trained specialists were needed to apply the program. In this environment, the aerospace industry was the typical user because they had critical projects which could justify the resources FEA demanded. With improvements to the software and wider use of mainframes, FEA technology gradually spread to large corporations that could afford the huge investment in hardware, software, and a dedicated FEA staff. Usage spread from primarily aerospace and military applications to the automobile and maritime industries.

The microprocessor revolution and the advent of Personal Computers (PCs) in the 1980s brought tremendous improvements in computing power, significant reductions in computing costs, and the steady development of numerical methods and algorithms. In the mid-1980s, Noran Engineering recognized the long-term advantages and impact that the PC hardware revolution could have on the engineering analysis field and embarked on a project to significantly enhance and modernize the original NASTRAN code and port it to PCs.

The first commercial version of NEi Nastran for use on PCs was released in 1990. The new code had a number of changes in architecture and programming language compared to legacy Nastran written originally for mainframes. These differences were intended to take advantage of the dramatic changes in computer hardware taking place and provide the code with key strategic advantages for the new PC platform. For example, since the cost of memory was dramatically reduced, it was feasible to perform many operations faster in memory that normally were only done on disk.

== Present day ==
NEi Nastran V10.0 was released in May 2010. It incorporates over 85 customer-driven enhancements, including the following additions: nonlinear composite Progressive Ply Failure Analysis (PPFA), concrete material model, direct enforced motion, bolt preload, enhanced rigid element features, visualization support for various entities, automatic dynamic plots during nonlinear analysis, transparent max/min, and a new look and feel for its Editor tool.

In August 2014, AutoDesk bought NEi Nastran, and the NEi Nastran technology is included in "Autodesk Nastran 2015", "Autodesk Nastran In-CAD 2015" and "Autodesk Simulation Mechanical 2015 R1".
