= Lorraine Olson =

American mechanical engineer

Lorraine G. (Lori) Olson is an American mechanical engineer whose research involves the application of the finite element method in the engineering design process and in medical diagnosis, including detecting breast cancer. She is a professor of mechanical engineering at the Rose–Hulman Institute of Technology.

== Education and career ==
Olson studied mechanical engineering at the Massachusetts Institute of Technology, earning a bachelor's degree in 1980, a master's degree in 1983, and a Ph.D. in 1985. Her dissertation, Finite Element Analysis of Fluid-Structure Interactions, was supervised by Klaus-Jürgen Bathe.

She became an assistant professor of mechanical engineering and applied mathematics at the University of Michigan from 1985 to 1990, when she moved to the Illinois Institute of Technology as an associate professor of mathematics. She returned to mechanical engineering as an associate professor at the University of Nebraska–Lincoln in 1991, and was promoted to full professor there in 1999. She has had her present position at the Rose-Hulman Institute of Technology since 2002, and served as department head there from 2014 to 2019.

== Recognition ==
Olson was elected as an ASME Fellow in 1998.
