= Edward L. Wilson =

American civil engineer and academic (born 1931)

- Born: September 5, 1931; Ferndale, California
- Education: University of California, Berkeley, B.S. 1955), M.S. (1959), D.Eng.(1963)
- Engineering career
- Discipline: structural engineering, earthquake engineering
- Institutions: University of California, Berkeley
- Awards: National Academy of Engineering, John von Neumann Award

Edward L. Wilson (born 1931) is an American civil engineer and academic known for his contributions to the development of finite element method. He was the T. Y. and Margaret Lin Professor in Engineering at the University of California, Berkeley and is professor emeritus, civil and environmental engineering, UC Berkeley. Wilson is a member of the National Academy of Engineering and a recipient of the John von Neumann Award.

Wilson is considered to be one of the early pioneers in the field of finite element analysis and its applications. He is credited with having written the first widely accepted computer package for structural analysis (SAP) and co-authored the widely cited book in FEM, "Numerical Methods in Finite Element Analysis", with Klaus-Jurgen Bathe.

Born September 5, 1931, in Ferndale, California, Wilson earned his B.S., M.S., and D.Eng. degrees from the University of California, Berkeley in 1955, 1959, and 1963, respectively. He earned the master's and a doctoral degree under Ray W. Clough.
