= ADINA =

Engineering simulation software

ADINA R & D, Inc.
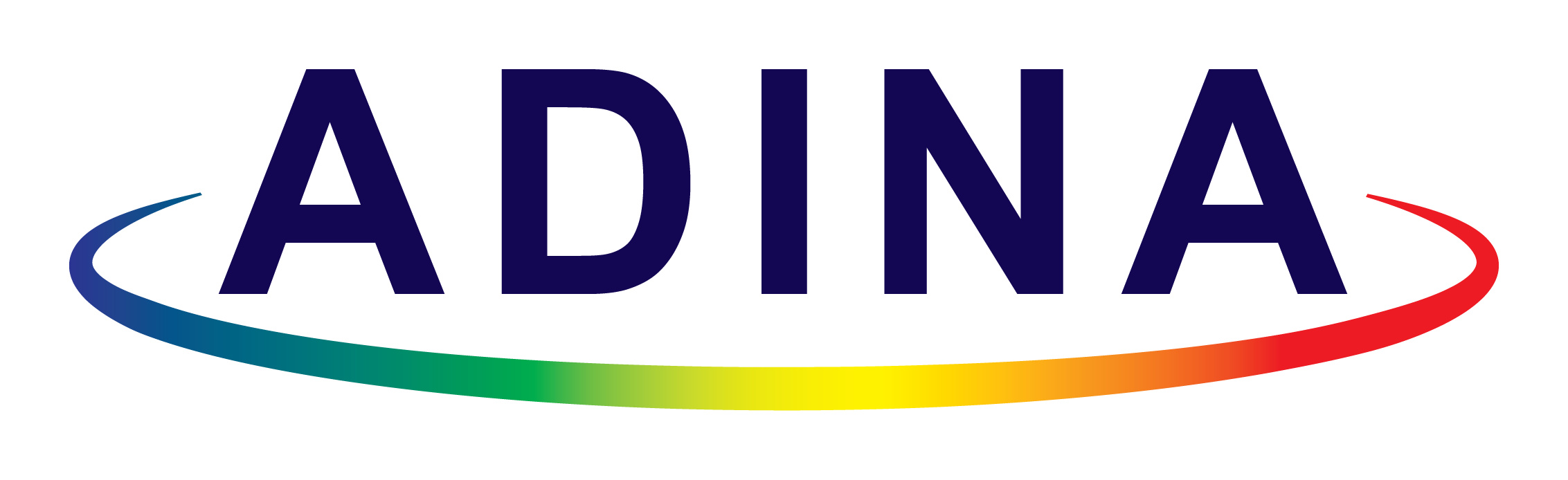
- Type: Private
- Industry: Computer Software
- Founded: September 3, 1986
- Founder: Dr. Klaus-Jürgen Bathe
- Headquarters: Watertown, Massachusetts, United States
- Area served: Worldwide
- Products: ADINA Structures; ADINA Thermal; ADINA CFD; ADINA EM
- Website: www.adina.com

ADINA is a commercial engineering simulation software program that is developed and distributed worldwide by ADINA R & D, Inc. The company was founded in 1986 by Dr. Klaus-Jürgen Bathe, and is headquartered in Watertown, Massachusetts, United States. On April 7, 2022, Bentley Systems acquired ADINA R&D, Inc.

ADINA is used in industry and academia to solve structural, fluid, heat transfer, and electromagnetic problems. ADINA can also be used to solve multiphysics problems, including fluid-structure interactions and thermo-mechanical problems.

Some of ADINA's nonlinear structural analysis code is offered as the NX Nastran Advanced Nonlinear module, Sol 601/701.

== History ==
The development of ADINA was started in 1974 by Dr. Klaus-Jürgen Bathe, shortly after he finished, as the principal developer, the finite element programs SAP IV and NONSAP.

In 1986, Dr. Bathe founded ADINA R & D, Inc. in Massachusetts, USA, and he continues to lead the development of ADINA as technical director of the company.

ADINA R & D performs all developments of the ADINA program in-house, and focuses on reliable and efficient finite element procedures. ADINA R & D sponsored twelve bi-yearly academic conferences at M.I.T. on nonlinear finite element analysis, the proceedings of which are published by Elsevier in the international journal Computers & Structures.

In 2003, ADINA R & D signed an OEM agreement with EDS. As a result of this agreement, some of ADINA's nonlinear structural analysis capabilities are now offered with NX Nastran by Siemens PLM Software. This version of ADINA is referred to as the Advanced Nonlinear module, Solution 601 / 701, for implicit / explicit solutions.

== Software Architecture ==
Fluid-structure interaction (FSI) results of an aortic heart valve, obtained by coupling the ADINA modules. The simulation was used to study how sinuses behind the aortic valve leaflets produce vortices that aid in closure with minimal transvalvular pressure.

ADINA is the acronym for Automatic Dynamic Incremental Nonlinear Analysis. The ADINA program consists of four core modules:

- ADINA Structures for linear and nonlinear analysis of solids and structures
- ADINA Thermal for analysis of heat transfer in solids and field problems
- ADINA CFD for analysis of compressible and incompressible flows, including heat transfer
- ADINA EM for analysis of electromagnetic phenomena

These modules can be used fully coupled together to solve multiphysics problems, where the response of the system is affected by the interaction of several distinct physical fields (e.g. fluid-structure interaction, thermo-mechanical analysis, piezoelectric coupling, Joule heating, fluid flow-mass transfer coupling, electromagnetic forces on fluids and structures, etc.).

Also, included in the ADINA suite of programs is a graphical user interface (known as the ADINA User Interface, or AUI) with a solid modeler, ADINA-M, for the pre- and post-processing tasks. The AUI can be used to import solid models, and finite element models in Nastran format, providing an interface to many CAD and CAE packages.

Furthermore, as part of the ADINA suite, Femap can be used for the pre- and post-processing of ADINA data in structural, CFD, and FSI analyses.

== See also ==
- List of computational fluid dynamics software
