= Jeff Gore =

Jeffrey Chen Gore
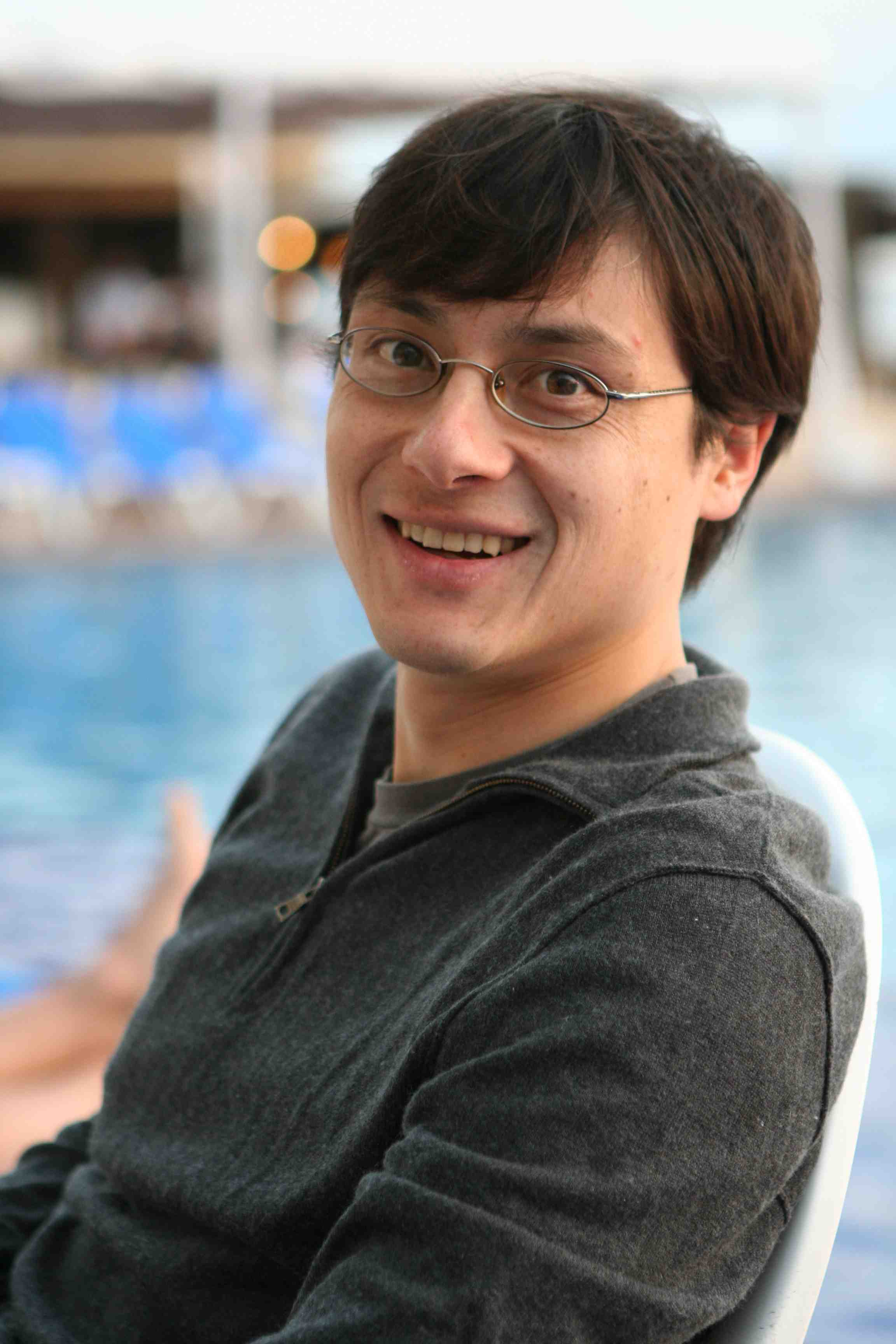
- Education: Massachusetts Institute of Technology
- Known for: Evolutional and ecological systems biology research, anti-penny activist
- Scientific career
- Fields: Physics
- Workplaces: Massachusetts Institute of Technology
- Thesis: Single-molecule studies of DNA twist mechanics and gyrase mechanochemistry (2005)
- Doctoral advisor: Carlos Bustamante

Jeff Gore is an American physicist and associate professor of physics at the Massachusetts Institute of Technology (MIT). He is also an advocate for repealing the United States penny, through the organization Citizens to Retire the U.S. Penny, which he founded.

== Education ==
Gore studied at MIT in the late 1990s as an undergraduate, and received his PhD from the University of California, Berkeley in 2005 with a Hertz Graduate Fellowship. His dissertation research was done in the laboratory of Carlos Bustamante, and focused on single-molecule biophysics.

== Academic career and research ==
Gore worked as a Pappalardo Fellow at MIT's physics department for three years, until January 2010, when he became an assistant professor there. In 2013, he published a study in which he and Alvaro Sanchez combined yeast cells that could break down table sugar normally with "cheated" off of other cells because they could not produce the enzymes that break down table sugar. The study found that the colonies containing both "cheaters" and normal cells grew almost the same size as the groups with only normal cells, but only in benign environments; when the researchers took away some of the colonies' sugar supply, all of the mixed groups became extinct.

== Activism ==
Gore's anti-penny activism first came to public attention when he posted a calculation of the cost of the penny to Americans in terms of wasted time ($5 billion) while a graduate student at the University of California, Berkeley. He is the founder of the organization "Citizens to Retire the Penny", through which he advocates for the elimination of the penny. Among his reasons for wanting to eliminate the penny are that the pennies that are made by the U.S. Mint typically make, according to Gore, "a one-way trip from the Mint to the stores, into our pockets, and then into some jar at home." Gore was interviewed on the Colbert Report in 2008 on the subject of pennies; he also endorsed Barack Obama's presidential campaign (this interview took place before the 2008 election).
