= Fabio Albinelli =

Italian footballer (born 1961)

Personal information
- Date of birth: 21 August 1961 (age 65)
- Place of birth: Modena, Italy
- Position: Defender

Senior career*
Years	Team	Apps	(Gls)
1979–1980	Bologna	9	(0)
1980–1981	Cesena	0	(0)
1981–1982	Alessandria	23	(1)
1982–1983	Parma	13	(0)
1984–1988	Carpi	90	(10)
- * Club domestic league appearances and goals as of 21 February 2015

Fabio Albinelli (born 21 August 1961) is a former Italian footballer who played as defender.
