= Klaus-Jürgen Bathe =

German engineer

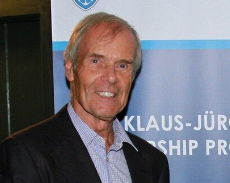
- Klaus-Jürgen Bathe in 2016
- Born: 1943 (age 82–83); Berlin, Germany
- Education: University of Cape Town; University of Calgary; University of California, Berkeley
- Known for: Finite element method Subspace iteration method MITC elements Bathe time integration schemes Overlapping finite elements ADINA software
- Scientific career
- Fields: Computational Science and Engineering; Finite element method
- Workplaces: Massachusetts Institute of Technology
- Doctoral advisor: Edward L. Wilson
- Doctoral students: Lorraine Olson

Klaus-Jürgen Bathe is a civil engineer, professor of mechanical engineering at the Massachusetts Institute of Technology, and founder of ADINA R&D, who specializes in computational science and engineering. He is considered to be one of the pioneers in the field of finite element analysis and its applications.

== Early life and education ==
He was born in Berlin as a second child to a lawyer who took part in Nazi Germany's Eastern Front operations and to a daughter of Günther Martini, a Fregattenkapitän in the Imperial German Navy during World War I and by 1927 an editor with the Danziger Zeitung. Both of his parents supported Adolf Hitler's regime. He spent part of the war with the Martinis in Lissa (present-day Leszno in Poland). During the final weeks of the war, he was evacuated by his mother and grandfather from Berlin to Borsum in Lower Saxony. After the war, his father was initially a clerk in the Federal Republic of Germany's government and subsequently a senior government councillor (Oberregierungsrat) across Lower Saxony, in Sarstedt, Hannover, Osnabrück and Oldenburg i. O.

Klaus-Jürgen Bathe completed his high school education in Oldenburg. During his hitchhiking travels in 1960, he visited the Italian and Commonwealth memorials of the Battle of El Alamein in Egypt. In order to avoid military draft, in March 1963 he left via London and Southampton for South Africa, initially to work for his grand-uncle at a farm near Gobabis in Namibia. He earned his graduate degree in Civil Engineering and Engineering Mechanics from the University of Cape Town in 1967. Bathe received his M.Sc. degree in Civil Engineering from the University of Calgary, Canada in 1969. He then studied with Alexander Scordelis at the University of California, Berkeley, and received his Ph.D. in Civil Engineering from the same university in 1971 under the supervision of Ed Wilson and Ray William Clough. His thesis was on numerical solution of large eigenvalue problems, where he developed the subspace iteration method.

== Career ==
During his time as a post-doctoral fellow (1972–1974) at UC Berkeley, Bathe et al. developed the finite element programs SAP IV and NONSAP, which have been used by thousands of individuals and organizations in research and practice and had a major impact in advancing the finite element method. In 1974 he started the development of the ADINA system. Soon after, he joined the department of mechanical engineering at MIT.

In 1986, he founded ADINA R&D, Inc. On April 7, 2022, Bentley Systems acquired ADINA R&D, Inc.

== Major contributions ==
Bathe has made fundamental contributions in the finite element analysis of structures, heat transfer, field problems, CFD, and fluid-structure interactions. These contributions are widely used in commercial software codes. Specifically, the following contributions for reliable, accurate and efficient finite element analyses are widely employed:

- Formulations of plate and shell finite elements (the MITC elements).
- Formulations of large deformations of solids (the Total and Updated Lagrangian formulations).
- Solution techniques for large eigenvalue problems (the Bathe subspace iteration method).
- Solution techniques for contact problems (the constraint-function method).
- Time integration schemes for the dynamic analysis of structures and fluid-structure interactions (the Bathe method).
- Schemes for fully coupled fluid-structure interactions and multi-physics problems.
- Mathematical analysis of finite element schemes.
- The book "Finite Element Procedures" used as a standard reference text in academia and industry.

Bathe is widely recognized to bridge the worlds of academia and industry in computational mechanics.

== Honors and awards ==
Bathe has received many honorary doctorates from institutions around the world: Slovak Academy of Sciences and Technical University of Zilina, Slovakia; Technical University of Darmstadt, Germany; Technical University of Rzeszow, Poland; Universidad Politécnica de Madrid, Spain; University of Bucharest, Romania; University of Miskolc, Hungary; University of Buenos Aires, Argentina; University of Cape Town, South Africa; and Sorbonne Universités – Université de Technologie de Compiègne, France.

Bathe has been listed as an ISI Highly Cited Author in Engineering by the ISI Web of Knowledge, Thomson Scientific Company, and has been listed in 2025 as one of the top three contributors worldwide during their lives to the development of the finite element method. He is honored by the University of Cambridge, U.K, bestowing the K.J. Bathe Award in Computational Science and Engineering.

== Editorial activities ==
Bathe served as an Editor-in-Chief of the journal Computers & Structures from 1996 to 2024 (published by Elsevier) and is now an Editor-in-Chief of the journal Machine Learning for Computational Science and Engineering. He is also the editor of the Springer's book series on Computational Fluid and Solid Mechanics. He has organized the twelve bi-yearly conferences "Nonlinear Finite Element Analysis and ADINA", at M.I.T., 1977–1999, and the seven bi-yearly conferences "Computational Fluid and Solid Mechanics" at M.I.T., 2001–2013.

== Klaus-Jürgen Bathe Leadership Program ==
The Klaus-Jürgen Bathe Leadership Programme was established at the University of Cape Town in 2014 through a gift donated by Professor Klaus-Jürgen Bathe. It is awarded annually to University of Cape Town students with at least 2 years of study left, from any of the six university faculties. The goal of this Program is to produce graduates coming from any faculty of the University of Cape Town, South Africa with outstanding leadership qualities and a strong sense of social justice, who will go on to play leading and significant roles in business, government, industry and civil society in South Africa and on the African continent.

== Books ==
- K.J. Bathe and E.L. Wilson, Numerical Methods in Finite Element Analysis, Prentice-Hall, 1976
- K.J. Bathe, Finite Element Procedures in Engineering Analysis, Prentice-Hall, 1982
- K.J. Bathe, Finite Element Procedures, 1st Edition, Prentice Hall, 1996; 2nd Edition, Watertown, MA: Klaus-Jürgen Bathe, 2014
- D. Chapelle and K.J. Bathe, The Finite Element Analysis of Shells – Fundamentals, 1st Edition, Springer, 2003; 2nd edition, Springer, 2011
- M. Kojic and K.J. Bathe, Inelastic Analysis of Solids and Structures, Springer, 2005
- K.J. Bathe, To Enrich Life, Amazon.com, 2007, 2nd edition 2019 (later versions as To Enrich Life – My journey & the finite element method)
- K.J. Bathe, How Lawyers Think, Work & when Perhaps not Hire a Lawyer, Amazon.com, 2021
- M.L. Bucalem, K.J. Bathe, The Mechanics of Solids and Structures – Hierarchical Modeling and the Finite Element Solution, Springer, 2011

== Video courses on finite element methods ==
- MIT Video Lectures: Finite Element Procedures for Solids and Structures – Linear Analysis
- MIT Video Lectures: Finite Element Procedures for Solids and Structures – Nonlinear Analysis

== Bibliography ==
- Anwar Bég, O. (2003). Giants of Engineering Science. Market Harborough: Troubadour Publishing. ISBN 978-1-899293-52-0.
- Bathe, Klaus-Jürgen (2007). To Enrich Life. Klaus-Jürgen Bathe. ISBN 978-0979004926.
