= Linda B. Nilson =

American author and educator

Linda B. Nilson is an American author, public speaker, and academic. She is the founding director emeritus of the Office of Teaching Effectiveness and Innovation at Clemson University.

She is known for her contributions to teaching strategies, course design, and faculty development.

Her work has focused on active learning (in-person and online), critical thinking, leading discussions, and self-regulated learning. She invented specifications grading, an alternative grading system.

== Early life and education ==
Nilson completed her undergraduate studies in sociology at the University of California, Berkeley, where she was elected to Phi Beta Kappa. She then pursued graduate studies in sociology at the University of Wisconsin, Madison, where she earned both her M.S. and Ph.D. degrees. To support her graduate education, Nilson was awarded a National Science Foundation Fellowship.

== Academic career ==
Nilson began her academic career as a sociology professor at the University of California, Los Angeles. During her tenure, she was selected to establish and supervise her department’s Teaching Assistant (TA) Training Program, marking her entry into the field of educational development.

Before joining Clemson University, Nilson directed teaching centers at Vanderbilt University and the University of California, Riverside.

At Clemson University, Nilson founded the Office of Teaching Effectiveness and Innovation, where she trained faculty in publishing scholarly articles and books in addition to teaching and assessment. She has held leadership positions in various organizations, including the Professional and Organizational Development (POD) Network in Higher Education, Toastmasters International, Mensa, and the Southern Regional Faculty and Instructional Development Consortium.

== Selected bibliography ==
=== Books ===
- Nilson, Linda B (March 1, 2023). Teaching at Its Best: A Research-Based Resource for College Instructors (5th ed.). Jossey-Bass. p. 432. ISBN 978-1119860228.
- Nilson, Linda B (2015). Specifications grading: restoring rigor, motivating students, and saving faculty time. Sterling, Virginia: Stylus Publishing. ISBN 978-1-62036-241-9.
- Nilson, Linda B (2013). Creating self-regulated learners: strategies to strengthen students' self-awareness and learning skills. Stylus Publishing: Sterling, Virginia. ISBN 978-1-57922-866-8.
- Nilson, Linda B (2007). The graphic syllabus and the outcomes map: communicating your course (1st ed.). San Francisco: Jossey-Bass. ISBN 978-0-470-18085-3. OCLC 145396468.
- Nilson, Linda B (March 16, 2021). Infusing Critical Thinking Into Your Course: A Concrete, Practical Approach. Stylus Publishing.

=== Journals ===
- Nilson, Douglas C.; Nilson, Linda Burzotta (1980-12-01). "Trust in elites and protest orientation: An integrative approach". Political Behavior. 2 (4): 385–404. doi:10.1007/BF00990175. ISSN 1573-6687.
- Biktimirov, Ernest N.; Nilson, Linda B. (2006). "Show Them the Money: Using Mind Mapping in the Introductory Finance Course". Journal of Financial Education. 32: 72–86. ISSN 0093-3961. JSTOR 41948535.
- Nilson, Linda Burzotta (1976). "The Social Standing of a Married Woman". Social Problems. 23 (5): 581–592. doi:10.2307/800480. ISSN 0037-7791. JSTOR 800480.
- Nilson, Linda Burzotta (1978). "The Social Standing of a Housewife". Journal of Marriage and Family. 40 (3): 541–548. doi:10.2307/350934. ISSN 0022-2445. JSTOR 350934.
- Nilson, Linda Burzotta (1979). "An Application of the Occupational "Uncertainty Principle" to the Professions". Social Problems. 26 (5): 570–581. doi:10.2307/800042. JSTOR 800042.
- Biktimirov, Ernest N.; Nilson, Linda B. (2003). "Mapping Your Course: Designing a Graphic Syllabus for Introductory Finance". Journal of Education for Business. 78 (6): 308–312. doi:10.1080/08832320309598618. ISSN 0883-2323.
- Nilson, Linda B.; Weaver, Barbara E. (2005). "Enhancing Learning with Laptops in the Classroom /". Jossey-Bass. ISSN 0271-0633.
- Holaday, Bonnie; Weaver, Kenneth A.; Nilson, Linda B. (2007). "Revisioning Graduate Professional-Development Programs". College Teaching. 55 (3): 99–103. doi:10.3200/CTCH.55.3.99-103. ISSN 8756-7555.
- Nilson, Linda B. (1985). "The Disaster Victim Community: Part of the Solution, not the Problem". Review of Policy Research. 4 (4): 689–697. doi:10.1111/j.1541-1338.1985.tb00317.x. ISSN 1541-132X.
