= Jennifer G. Murphy =

Canadian environmental chemist and academic

- Born: Calgary Alberta, Canada
- Citizenship: Canadian
- Education: McGill University (BS), University of California Berkeley (Ph.D), University of East Anglia (post-doctorate)
- Awards: Ascent Award-Atmospheric Sciences American Geophysical Union

Jennifer G. Murphy is a Canadian environmental chemist and an associate professor at the University of Toronto. She is known for her research on how air pollutants such as increased reactive nitrogen affect the global climate.

== Early life and education ==
In 2000, she graduated with honors at McGill University and earned her Bachelor of Science in Chemistry with a minor in Environmental Science. She then, worked to get her Ph.D. in Physical Chemistry at the University of California Berkeley from 2000 to 2005. Later that year, she went to the University of East Anglia to get her post doctorate, finishing in 2006.

== Career and research ==
Murphy is a professor at the University of Toronto under the Department of Chemistry. Since starting as a faculty member in 2007, her research has focused on understanding the effects of atmospheric pollutants on air quality and the Earth's climate. Her work entails the development and application of new analytical techniques for use in the measurement of trace components of the atmosphere. This includes measurements made as both part of short-duration field intensives and longer-term monitoring efforts. Through the development and usage of long-term, precise and accurate observations with adequate geographic coverage and spatial resolution, Murphy and her group work to improve the process-level representation of chemical systems and biosphere-atmosphere exchange in earth systems models.

From 2007 to 2016, she held the title of Tier II Canada Research Chair. Then, from 2015-2018 and 2020-2021, she was the Associate Chair of Graduate Studies. In 2020, she became a mentor of the NETCARE team whose research on aerosol and climate in the Canadian Artic was awarded the Brockhouse Canada Prize of Interdisciplinary Research in Science and Engineering. Later on, in 2024, she received the Canadian Society of Chemistry's Clara Benson Award.

She is one of the members of the Board of Trustees of the Royal Canadian Institute for Science. This prestigious organization strives to educate the Canadian public through innovative and engaging ways of teaching science. She is currently a member of the Scientific Steering Community (SSC) of the International Global Atmospheric Chemistry organization (IGAC).

== Awards and honors ==
- 2019 Earned the Ascent Award in the field of Atmospheric Sciences from the American Geophysical Union (AGU) which recognizes excellence in research and leadership among mid-career scientists.

== Publications ==
Murphy specializes her research in Atmospheric Chemistry, Biogeochemistry and Analytical Chemistry. Within these, she focuses on measuring reactive nitrogen compounds from the field, in order to assess her understanding of the rates and mechanisms of chemical transformations in the environment. Advanced analytical techniques are required to interpret air quality, climate change, acid precipitation and ecosystem function. Some of her most recent and well-known works are listed below:

- Dimethyl Sulfide in the Summertime Arctic atmosphere: Measurements and Source Sensitivity Simulations, (2016), Atmospheric Chemistry and Physics
- An Atmospheric Constraint on the NO2 Dependence of Daytime Near-Surface Nitrous Acid (HONO), (2015), Atmospheric Chemical Society
- Experimental and Theoretical Understanding of the Gas Phase Oxidation of Atmospheric Amides with OH Radicals: Kinetics, Products, and Mechanisms, (2014), American Chemical Society
- Improved Characterization of Gas–Particle Partitioning for Per- and Polyfluoroalkyl Substances in the Atmosphere Using Annular Diffusion Denuder Samplers, (2012), American Chemical Society
- Long term changes in nitrogen oxides and volatile organic compounds in Toronto and the challenges facing local ozone control, (2009), Elsevier Ltd.
