= MSC Adams =

Multibody dynamics simulation software system

MSC ADAMS (Automated Dynamic Analysis of Mechanical Systems) is a multibody dynamics simulation software system. It is currently owned by MSC Software Corporation. The simulation software solver runs mainly on Fortran and more recently C++ as well. According to the publisher, Adams is the most widely used multibody dynamics simulation software. The software package runs on both Windows and Linux.

1 DOF Pendulum with spring-damper Adams simulation with input vibration

== Capabilities ==
Adams has a full graphical user interface to model the entire mechanical assembly in a single window. Graphical computer-aided design tools are used to insert a model of a mechanical system in three-dimensional space or import geometry files such as STEP or IGS. Joints can be added between any two bodies to constrain their motion. Variety of inputs such as velocities, forces, and initial conditions can be added to the system.

Adams simulates the behavior of the system over time and can animate its motion and compute properties such as accelerations, forces, etc. The system can include further complicated dynamic elements like springs, friction, flexible bodies, and contact between bodies. The software also provides extra CAE tools such as design exploration and optimization based on selected parameters. The inputs and outputs of the simulation can be interfaced with Simulink for applications such as control.

== Applications ==
The Adams software package is used both in academic research and engineering. The most common usage of the software is analysis of vehicle structure and suspension through the Adams/Car and Adams/Tire modules. Various types of mechanical systems such as wind turbines, powertrains, and robotic systems.
