= Kevin Sivula =

American molecular engineer

Professor Kevin Sivula
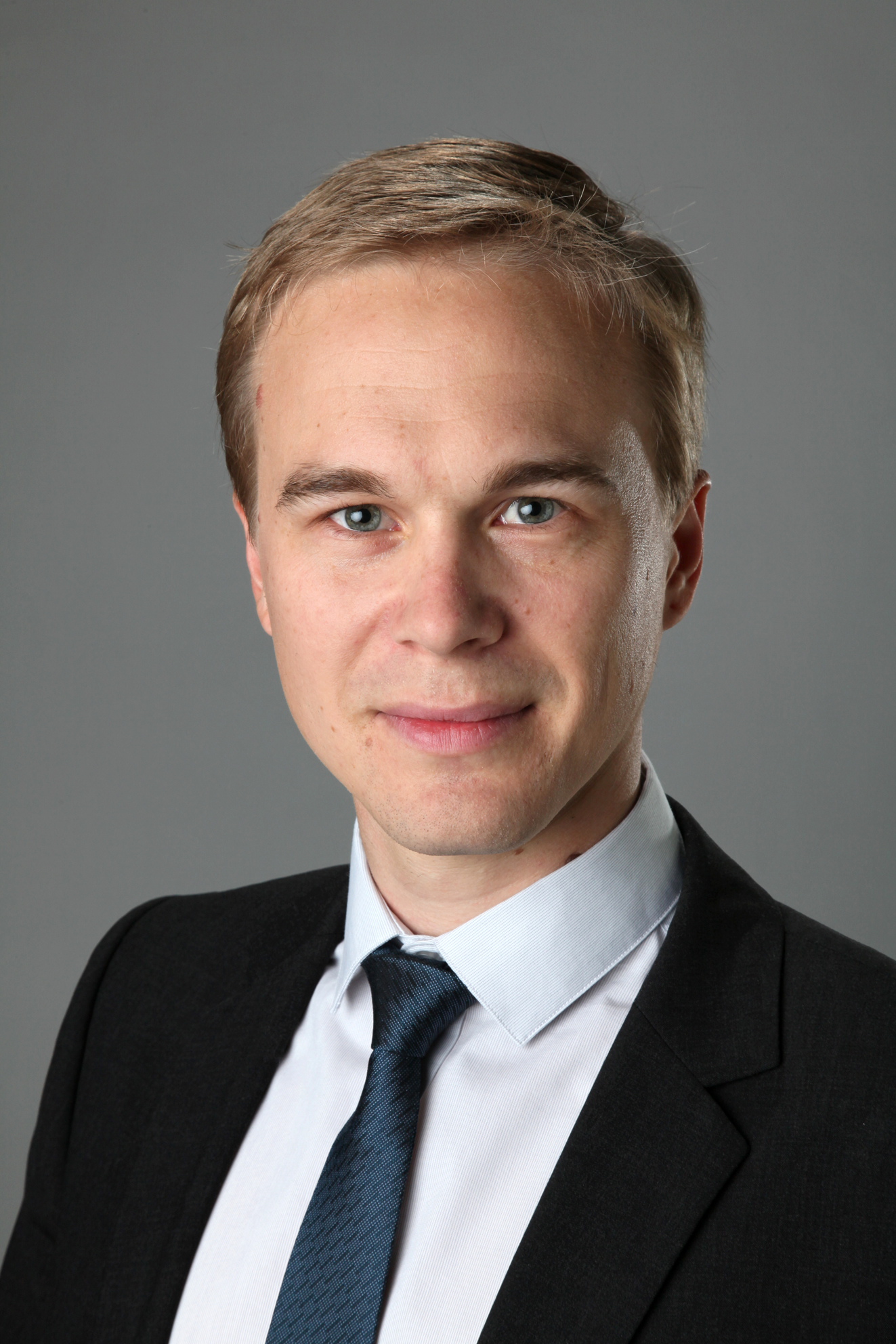
- Kevin Sivula in 2012
- Born: 1979 (age 46–47); Minnesota, USA
- Citizenship: USA
- Awards: Werner Prize; Air Liquide Essential Small Molecules Award; Prix Zeno Karl Schindler

Academic background
- Education: Chemical engineering, University of Minnesota; University of California, Berkeley
- Thesis: [ProQuest 304901162 Controlling the morphology of solution-processed bulk heterojunction photovoltaics] (2007)

Academic work
- Discipline: Chemical engineering
- Sub-discipline: Molecular engineering
- Institutions: EPFL (École Polytechnique Fédérale de Lausanne)
- Main interests: Photoelectrochemistry; Organic semiconductors 2D semiconductors Solar energy conversion Nanomaterials
- Website: https://www.epfl.ch/labs/limno/

Kevin Sivula (born 1979 in Minnesota, USA) is a highly cited American chemical engineer and researcher in the field of solar cells. He is a professor of molecular engineering at EPFL (École Polytechnique Fédérale de Lausanne) and the head of the Laboratory for Molecular Engineering of Optoelectronic Nanomaterials at EPFL's School of Basic Sciences.

== Career ==
Sivula studied at the University of Minnesota and obtained a bachelor's degree in chemical engineering in 2002. He completed a doctorate with a thesis on "Controlling the morphology of solution-processed bulk heterojunction photovoltaics" in 2007 at the University of California, Berkeley under the direction of Jean Fréchet.

He then joined Michael Grätzel's group at EPFL as a postdoctoral researcher and investigated photo-electrochemical processes of water splitting.

In 2011, he became tenure track assistant professor and began an independent research program at EPFL's Institute of Chemical Sciences and Engineering. In 2018, he was promoted to associate professor of chemical engineering, and in 2024 he was promoted to full professor. He directs the Laboratory for Molecular Engineering of Optoelectronic Nanomaterials and teaches courses in transport phenomena, chemical product design, and solar energy conversion. He is currently serving as the Director of the Institute of Chemical Sciences and Engineering at EPFL.

== Research ==
Sivula's research is dedicated to the understanding and engineering of charge transport and transfer in novel and inexpensive optoelectronic materials, in particular for solar energy conversion. The development of economical and robust semiconducting materials that can be processed by rapid roll-to-roll techniques into high-performance devices represents a significant challenge and is crucial to enabling low-cost global-scale solar energy conversion. Therefore, his research is directed towards understanding composition, crystallinity, self-assembly, and morphology in key systems in order to control the electronic band gap, light absorption, charge transfer, and carrier transport in thin film semiconductors to enable advance device performance. He contributed important research advances in three main areas: Semiconductors for solar-fuel production, understanding and controlling charge transport in thin film organic semiconductors, and solution processing and self-assembly of 2D-semiconductors.

His research was featured on Photonics, Nano Werk, Swiss nation TV RTS, Reuters, Clean Technica, and Futura Sciences.

== Distinctions ==
Sivula is the recipient of the 2017 Werner Prize by the Swiss Chemical Society Werner Prize, the 2016 Air Liquide Essential Small Molecules Award, the 2011 Prix Zeno Karl Schindler, and the 2007 Graduate Student Gold Award by the Materials Research Society.

He is a member of the American Chemical Society and the Swiss Chemical Society.

In 2020, Clarivate ranked him among the 1000 most highly cited researchers.

== Selected works ==
- Sivula, Kevin; Le Formal, Florian; Grätzel, Michael (18 April 2011). "Solar Water Splitting: Progress Using Hematite (α-Fe2O3) Photoelectrodes". ChemSusChem. 4 (4): 432–449. doi:10.1002/cssc.201000416. PMID 21416621.
- Tilley, S. David; Cornuz, Maurin; Sivula, Kevin; Grätzel, Michael (23 August 2010). "Light-Induced Water Splitting with Hematite: Improved Nanostructure and Iridium Oxide Catalysis". Angewandte Chemie International Edition. 49 (36): 6405–6408. doi:10.1002/anie.201003110. PMID 20665613.
- Paracchino, Adriana; Laporte, Vincent; Sivula, Kevin; Grätzel, Michael; Thimsen, Elijah (June 2011). "Highly active oxide photocathode for photoelectrochemical water reduction". Nature Materials. 10 (6): 456–461. Bibcode:2011NatMa..10..456P. doi:10.1038/nmat3017. PMID 21552270.
- Sivula, Kevin; van de Krol, Roel (20 January 2016). "Semiconducting materials for photoelectrochemical energy conversion". Nature Reviews Materials. 1 (2): 15010. Bibcode:2016NatRM...115010S. doi:10.1038/natrevmats.2015.10. S2CID 138751980.
- Dotan, Hen; Sivula, Kevin; Grätzel, Michael; Rothschild, Avner; Warren, Scott C. (2011). "Probing the photoelectrochemical properties of hematite (α-Fe 2 O 3 ) electrodes using hydrogen peroxide as a hole scavenger". Energy Environ. Sci. 4 (3): 958–964. doi:10.1039/C0EE00570C.
- Prévot, Mathieu S.; Sivula, Kevin (5 September 2013). "Photoelectrochemical Tandem Cells for Solar Water Splitting". The Journal of Physical Chemistry C. 117 (35): 17879–17893. doi:10.1021/jp405291g.
- Brillet, Jeremie; Yum, Jun-Ho; Cornuz, Maurin; Hisatomi, Takashi; Solarska, Renata; Augustynski, Jan; Graetzel, Michael; Sivula, Kevin (December 2012). "Highly efficient water splitting by a dual-absorber tandem cell". Nature Photonics. 6 (12): 824–828. Bibcode:2012NaPho...6..824B. doi:10.1038/nphoton.2012.265. S2CID 122196272.
