= Firehole Composites =

- Type: Private
- Industry: Composite Materials Analysis & Simulation
- Founded: 2000
- Headquarters: Laramie, Wyoming
- Key people: Jerad Stack, CEO

Firehole Composites (formerly Firehole Technologies, Inc.) was a supplier of computer-aided engineering (CAE) software and consulting services specializing in analysis of composite materials. Founded in 2000, the company's mission is to provide enabling technologies to further the widespread use of composite materials. Their products include Helius:MCT (a multiscale simulation tool for composite progressive failure analysis), Helius:CompositePro (a classical laminate theory and simple structural analysis tool), Helius:MatSim (an online micromechanics lamina simulator), and Prospector:Composites (an online composite material properties database hosted by IDES Inc.).

Firehole’s principal product, Helius:MCT, is a simulation tool built to improve the accuracy of composite structure analysis and is available as an advanced capability add-on to commercial finite element analysis (FEA) packages (such as Abaqus and ANSYS). It is based on Multicontinuum Technology (MCT), an analysis methodology developed specifically for composites which, rather than treating the composite as a homogeneous material, extracts the separate stress and strain fields for the constituents (fiber and matrix) of a composite material. In doing so, distinct failure criteria and material nonlinearity can be applied separately. This permits Helius:MCT to identify failure of individual material constituents and degrade a composite material accordingly, providing a robust progressive failure simulation that captures failure initiation all the way up to and beyond ultimate structural failure.

Firehole was acquired by Autodesk in 2013 for an undisclosed sum.

== Company background ==
Firehole Composites began in the academic research of composite material analysis during the mid-1990s. The core technology was part of an academic research project underway in the Mechanical Engineering Department of the University of Wyoming. In 2000, a number of graduate students and faculty at UW saw the commercial potential of the technology and founded Firehole Composites. Firehole Composites continues a collaborative relationship with the University of Wyoming and sponsors ongoing research into composite analysis technology.

During its first years of existence the company focused on the research and development of composite technologies utilizing the US Small Business Innovation Research (SBIR) and Small Business Technology Transfer (STTR) Programs. Recent technology demonstration efforts have included participation in the World Wide Failure Exercise and a large structures failure analysis and test program with the US AFRL Space Vehicle’s Directorate.

In January 2009, Firehole launched their first commercial product – Helius:MCT. The name Helius, a general branding for Firehole products, refers to the Greek god of sun and vision and represents the idea of added vision or insight into composite material analysis.

=== Associations ===
- ASME – American Society of Mechanical Engineers
- NAFEMS – National Agency for Finite Element Methods and Standards
- AIAA – American Institute of Aeronautics and Astronautics

=== Firehole name ===
Firehole Composites name sake is the Firehole River, a Wyoming river that originates in Yellowstone National Park. The Firehole is unique because it flows through several geyser basins which empty hot water into it, often causing steam to rise. It was named by early trappers because the steam makes it appear as if it is on fire. The Firehole is also known for exceptional fly fishing.
