= MSC Software =

American simulation software technology company

MSC Software Corporation
- Company type: Subsidiary
- Industry: computer aided engineering (CAE) software; simulation software
- Founded: 1963; 63 years ago
- Headquarters: Newport Beach, California, US
- Key people: Paolo Guglielmini, President, Manufacturing Intelligence division; Roger Assaker, CEO; John Janevic, COO
- Products: MSC Apex; Actran; Adams; Digimat; Dytran; Easy5; Marc; MaterialCenter; MSC Fatigue; MSC Nastran; Patran; PICLS scFLOW scSTREAM; SimDesigner; SimManager; SimXpert; Sinda; APex Generative Design; Simufact; Interactive Physics
- Revenue: US$230 million (2016)
- Owner: Cadence Design Systems
- Number of employees: 1,400
- Website: mscsoftware.com

MSC Software Corporation is an American simulation software technology company headquartered in Newport Beach, California. Specializing in simulation software, it employs approximately 1,400 people in twenty countries and had revenues of US$230 million in 2016.

== History ==
The company was formed as MacNeal-Schwendler Corporation (MSC) in 1963 by Dr. Richard H. MacNeal and Robert Schwendle. Having developed SADSAM (Structural Analysis by Digital Simulation of Analog Methods) at that time as its first structural analysis software, it was deeply involved in the early efforts of the aerospace industry to improve early finite element analysis technology.

A key milestone was responding to a NASA request for proposal in 1965 for a general-purpose structural analysis program that would eventually become Nastran (NASA Structural Analysis). Subsequently, MSC pioneered many of the technologies that are now relied upon by industry to analyse and predict stress and strain, vibration and dynamics, acoustics, and thermal analysis.

Two years after marketing the MSC/Nastran as the commercial version of the Nastran, the company established its first overseas office in Munich, Germany in 1973 and then an office in Tokyo, Japan in 1976. Having made its debut as a public company in 1983, its stock migrated to the American Stock Exchange the following year.

After MSC expanded and opened a subsidiary in Moscow, Russia, in 1992 and an office in Brazil in 1995, its shareholders voted to change the company's name to MSC.Software Corporation in June 1999.

Acquired by Symphony Technology Group in 2009, the "dot" in its name was removed two years later, and the company became known as MSC Software Corporation. In 2017, it was acquired by the Swedish technology firm Hexagon AB for US$834 million, operating as its independent subsidiary.

In September 2025, Cadence Design Systems announced it would acquire the design and engineering business of Hexagon, including MSC Software, for approximately $3.16 billion. On February 23, 2026, it was reported that the transaction had been completed.

== Acquisitions ==
- September 1994 — PDA Engineering
- December 1998 — Knowledge Revolution
- May 1999 — MSC Software acquired MARC Analysis Research Corporation to add software that tests complex designs and materials.
- June 1999 — Universal Analytics Incorporation (UAI)
- November 1999 — Computerized Structural Analysis Research Corporation (CSAR)
- May 2001 — Advanced Enterprise Solutions Inc. (AES).
- March 2002 — MSC Software acquired Mechanical Dynamics Inc. to increase its client base to over 10,000 companies.
- January 2008 — MSC Software acquired thermal analysis company Network Analysis Inc. to solidify its ability to serve the thermal management market.
- September 2011 — MSC Software acquired acoustic simulation company Free Field Technologies, S.A.FFT to extend its solutions to acoustic simulation
- September 2012 — MSC Software acquired composite material simulation leader e-Xstream engineering company.
- February 2015 — MSC Software acquired Simufact Engineering, a leader in the simulation of metal forming and joining processes.
- December 2016 — MSC Software Acquired Software Cradle Co., Ltd, a leader in CFD simulation.
- May 2017 — MSC acquires Vires Simulationstechnologie GmbH, a leader in autonomous vehicle simulation.

== See also ==
- MSC Adams
- Actran
- MSC Nastran
