= Dino Di Carlo =

American bioengineer

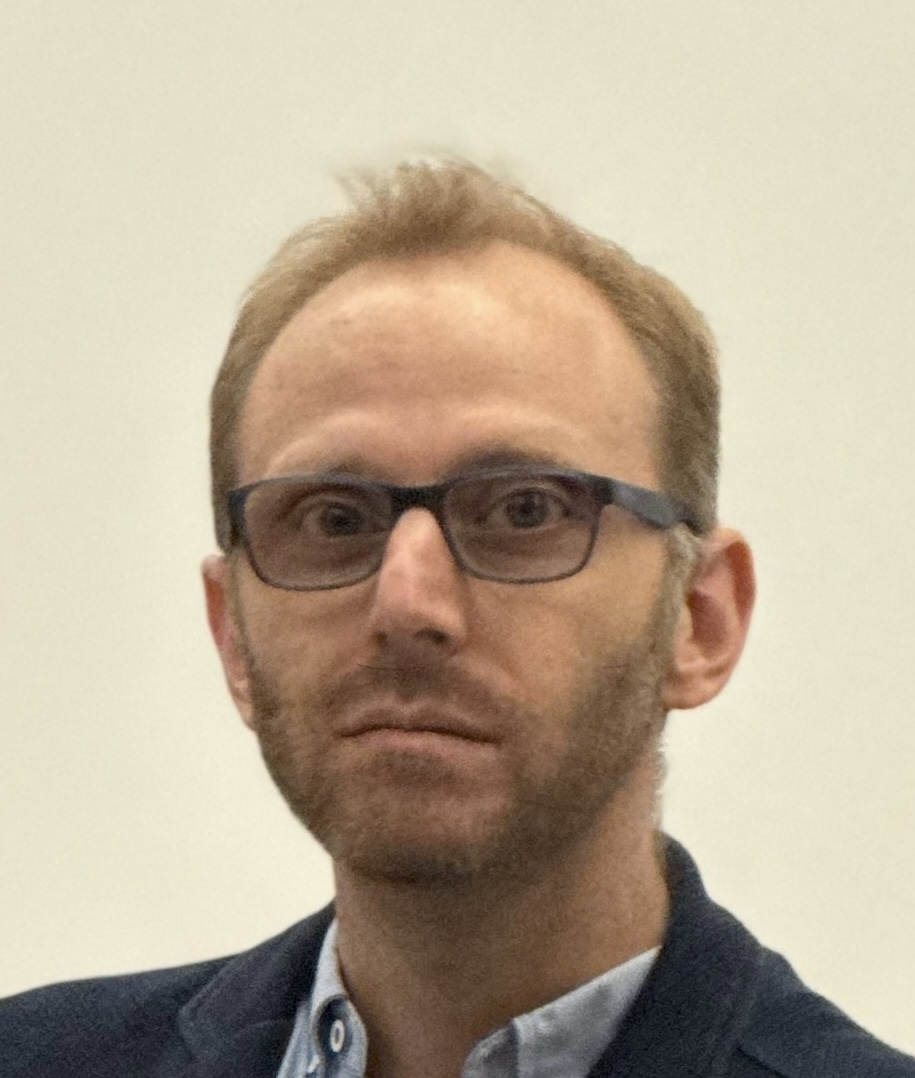
- Education: University of California, Berkeley (B.S. in Bioengineering, 2002); University of California, Berkeley and University of California, San Francisco (Ph.D. in Bioengineering, 2006); Harvard Medical School (Postdoctoral studies, Center for Engineering in Medicine, 2006–2008)
- Known for: Inertial Microfluidics, Smart Biomaterials, Mechanomedicine, Quantum Diagnostics
- Scientific career
- Thesis: Microfluidic Technologies for Single Cell Analysis (2006)
- Doctoral advisor: Luke Pyungse Lee

Dino Di Carlo is the current Department Chair of Bioengineering as well as the Armond and Elena Hairapetian Chair in Engineering and Medicine at University of California, Los Angeles. He is a professor of Bioengineering and Mechanical and Aerospace Engineering.

He received his Ph.D. in bioengineering from University of California, Berkeley and San Francisco. He has been a faculty in the Department of Bioengineering at UCLA since 2008. His research focuses on Inertial Microfluidics and numerous other fields of biomedicine and biotechnology. He has also co-founded five companies biased on the research done in his lab at UCLA. In 2016, he was awarded the Presidential Early Career Award for Scientists and Engineers (PECASE).

== Early life ==
Di Carlo grew up in Monterey, California, where he attended middle school. While in middle school he would often read his mother's medical-textbooks, sparking an interest in applying technology to medicine.

== Education and research ==
Di Carlo received his B.S. in bioengineering from the University of California, Berkeley in 2002 and his Ph.D. in bioengineering from the joint University of California, Berkeley and University of California, San Francisco program in 2006. His thesis was titled “Microfluidic Technologies for Single Cell Analysis.” He conducted postdoctoral research from 2006 to 2008 at the Center for Engineering in Medicine at Harvard Medical School.

Di Carlo later joined the University of California, Los Angeles faculty in 2008, where his research focuses on focuses on inertial microfluidics, smart biomaterials, mechanomedicine, and quantum diagnostics. As of November 2025, he has over 180 publications, over 35,000 citations, and an h-index of 91.

== Career ==
He has been a faculty member in the Department of Biogeneering at UCLA in 2008. In 2020 he became the Armond and Elena Hairapetian Chair in Engineering and Medicine. In 2024 he became the Department Chair of Bioengineering at UCLA.

Guided by a focus on real-world impact, Di Carlo emphasizes translating research beyond academic publications. Di Carlo has co-founded five companies to commercialize UCLA intellectual property and bring microfluidic and biomedical innovations to market.

== Awards ==
Di Carlo's contributions to bioengineering have been recognized with many honors. Most notably, he received the Presidential Early Career Award for Scientists and Engineers (PECASE) in 2016, the highest honor bestowed by the U.S. government on early-career researchers.

He was also awarded the David and Lucile Packard Fellowship in Science and Engineering in 2011 and the National Institutes of Health (NIH) Director's New Innovator Award in 2010. His research has also been supported through the Defense Advanced Research Projects Agency (DARPA) Young Faculty Award. He was elected a Fellow of the International Academy of Medical and Biological Engineering (IAMBE) in 2022.

== Select publications ==
- Dino Di Carlo; Daniel Irimia; R. G. Tompkins; Mehmet Toner (2007). "Continuous inertial focusing, ordering, and separation of particles in microchannels". Proceedings of the National Academy of Sciences. 104 (48): 18892–18897. doi:10.1073/pnas.0704958104. PMC 2141878. PMID 18025477.
- Dino Di Carlo (2009). "Inertial microfluidics". Lab on a Chip. 9 (21): 3038–3046. doi:10.1039/B912547G. PMID 19823716.
- Daniel R. Gossett; William M. Weaver; Adam J. Mach; Scott C. Hur; Henry T. K. Tse; Waikit Lee; Hassan Amini; Dino Di Carlo (2010). "Label-free cell separation and sorting in microfluidic systems". Analytical and Bioanalytical Chemistry. 397 (8): 3249–3267. doi:10.1007/s00216-010-3721-9. PMC 2911537. PMID 20419490.
- Donald R. Griffin; William M. Weaver; Patrick O. Scumpia; Dino Di Carlo; Tatiana Segura (2015). "Accelerated wound healing by injectable microporous gel scaffolds assembled from annealed building blocks". Nature Materials. 14 (7): 737–744. doi:10.1038/nmat4294. PMC 4615579. PMID 25915195.
- Daniel R. Gossett; Henry T. K. Tse; Shirley A. Lee; Yongjie Ying; Andrew G. Lindgren; Owen O. Yang; Jayoung Rao; Dino Di Carlo (2012). "Hydrodynamic stretching of single cells for large-population mechanical phenotyping". Proceedings of the National Academy of Sciences. 109 (20): 7630–7635. doi:10.1073/pnas.1200107109. PMC 3356639. PMID 22547795.
