= MSC Marc =

Nonlinear finite element analysis software

- Original author: Pedro Marcal
- Developer: MSC Software (now part of Hexagon AB)
- Initial release: 1971
- Operating system: Cross-platform
- Type: Finite element analysis software
- License: Proprietary
- Website: www.mscsoftware.com/product/marc

MSC Marc is a nonlinear finite elements analysis software used to simulate behavior of complex materials and interaction under large deformations and strains. It can also simulate multi-physics scenarios across structural, thermal, piezoelectric, electrostatic, magnetostatic, and electromagnetic behaviors. It uses automatic two-dimensional and three-dimensional remeshing to analyze structures undergoing large distortions, and crack propagation.

== History ==
Marc was the first commercial nonlinear finite element software developed by Marc Analysis Research Corporation founded in 1971 by Dr. Pedro Marcal. It was acquired in 1999 by MSC Software Corporation. Mentat is the dedicated pre- and post-processor used to support Marc. As of 2025 the packet was maintained by the Hexagon AB.

== Introduction ==
Engineering structures and systems often use nonlinear materials and experience complex interactions between various parts. For example, the stress-strain curve of an elastomer is highly nonlinear. During installation, elastomeric components could fold onto themselves and could undergo buckling. Their properties change with temperature and time. These nonlinearities are often grouped into three major categories, namely geometric, material and boundary condition nonlinearities. Marc is used to perform Finite Element Analysis of structures accounting for all these nonlinearities, in one, two and three dimensions.

== Technology ==
Marc can be used to run various types of mechanical simulations.

- Linear statics
- Linear dynamics
- Nonlinear statics
- Nonlinear dynamics
- Buckling
- Heat transfer
- Diffusion
- Electromagnetics
- Electrostatics
- Magnetostatics

Marc can also simulate coupled physical phenomena like:

- Themomechnical
- Electrical-Thermal-Mechanical
- Piezoelectric
- Induction heating
- Thermal-Electrical (Joule heating)
- Magnetodynamic-Thermal
- Magnetostatic-Structural
- Magnetostatic-Thermal

Various constitutive formulations are used during simulations to represent the behavior of materials used in the designs. Marc can be used to model materials like:

- Metals, below and above yield point
- Composite materials
- Gaskets
- Thermomechanical shape memory alloys
- Soils
- Powder metals
- Concrete
- Elastomers
- Plastics

== Applications ==
Marc is used in several industries including automotive, aerospace, machinery, electronics, biomedical, oil and gas, consumer goods and packaging, manufacturing, civil engineering and mining to solve complex nonlinear problems that involve large deformations and strains, contact interaction, damage, fracture and failure.

== See also ==
- MSC Software
