= Guyan reduction =

Dimensionality reduction method

In computational mechanics, Guyan reduction, is a dimensionality reduction method which reduces the number of degrees of freedom by ignoring the inertial terms of the equilibrium equations and expressing the unloaded degrees of freedom in terms of the loaded degrees of freedom.

== Basic concept ==
The static equilibrium equation can be expressed as:

$$\mathbf{K}\mathbf{d} = \mathbf{f}$$

where $\mathbf{K}$ is the stiffness matrix, $\mathbf{f}$ the force vector, and $\mathbf{d}$ the displacement vector. The number of the degrees of freedom of the static equilibrium problem is the length of the displacement vector. By partitioning the above system of linear equations with regards to loaded (active) and unloaded (omitted) degrees of freedom, the static equilibrium equation may be expressed as:

$$\begin{bmatrix}
\mathbf{K}_{aa} & \mathbf{K}_{ao} \\
\mathbf{K}_{oa} & \mathbf{K}_{oo}
\end{bmatrix}
\begin{Bmatrix}
\mathbf{d}_{a} \\
\mathbf{d}_{o}
\end{Bmatrix}
=
\begin{Bmatrix}
\mathbf{f}_{a} \\
\mathbf{f}_{o}
\end{Bmatrix}$$

Focusing on the lower partition of the above system of linear equations, the dependent (omitted) degrees of freedom are expressed by the following equation.

$$\mathbf{K}_{oa} \mathbf{d}_{a} + \mathbf{K}_{oo}\mathbf{d}_{o} = \mathbf{f}_{o}$$

Solving the above equation in terms of the independent (active) degrees of freedom leads to the following dependency relations

$$\mathbf{d}_{o} = \mathbf{K}_{oo}^{-1}\mathbf{f}_{o}- \mathbf{K}_{oo}^{-1}\mathbf{K}_{oa}\mathbf{d}_{a}$$

Substituting the dependency relations on the upper partition of the static equilibrium problem condenses away the omitted degrees of freedom, leading to the following reduced system of linear equations.

$$\left[\mathbf{K}_{aa} - \mathbf{K}_{ao}\mathbf{K}_{oo}^{-1}\mathbf{K}_{oa}\right]\mathbf{d}_{a} = \mathbf{f}_{a}-\mathbf{K}_{ao}\mathbf{K}_{oo}^{-1}\mathbf{f}_{o}$$

This can be rewritten as:

$\mathbf{K}_{reduced}\mathbf{d}_{a}=\mathbf{f}_{reduced}$

The above system of linear equations is equivalent to the original problem, but expressed in terms of the active degrees of freedom alone. Thus, the Guyan reduction method results in a reduced system by condensing away the omitted degrees of freedom.

== Linear transformation ==
The Guyan reduction can also be expressed as a change of basis which produces a low-dimensional representation of the original space, represented by the active degrees of freedom. The linear transformation that maps the reduced space onto the full space is expressed as:

$$\begin{Bmatrix}
\mathbf{d}_a \\
\mathbf{d}_o
\end{Bmatrix} =
\begin{bmatrix}
\mathbf{I} \\
- \mathbf{K}_{oo}^{-1}\mathbf{K}_{oa}
\end{bmatrix}
\begin{Bmatrix}
\mathbf{d}_a
\end{Bmatrix}
=
\begin{Bmatrix}
\mathbf{T}_G
\end{Bmatrix}
\begin{Bmatrix}
\mathbf{d}_a
\end{Bmatrix}$$

where $\mathbf{T}_G$ represents the Guyan reduction transformation matrix. Thus, the reduced problem is represented as:

$$\mathbf{K}_G\mathbf{d}_a = \mathbf{f}_G$$

In the above equation, $\mathbf{K}_G$ represents the reduced system of linear equations that's obtained by applying the Guyan reduction transformation on the full system, which is expressed as:

$$\mathbf{K}_G = \mathbf{T}_G^T \mathbf{K} \mathbf{T}_G$$

and $\mathbf{f}_G = \mathbf{T}_G^T \mathbf{f}$

== Application ==
The Guyan reduction is an integral part of the classic dynamic substructuring method known as the Craig-Bampton (CB) method. The static portion of the reduced system matrices derived from the CB method is a direct result of the Guyan reduction. It is calculated in the same manner as the Guyan stiffness matrix $\mathbf{K}_G$ shown above. The term $\mathbf{T}_G$, in the CB domain, is referred to as the constraint modes, $[\mathbf{\phi}_c]$. It represents the displacement of all unloaded degrees of freedom when a unit displacement is applied at a single, loaded, degree of freedom, while keeping the rest constrained.

== See also ==
- Model order reduction
- Finite element method
- Schur complement - arising in the field of linear algebra when performing a block Gaussian elimination on a matrix.
