= James Michael Lisy =

American physicist

James Michael Lisy is an American physicist.

He gained his B.S. degree from Iowa State University in 1974 and his Ph.D. from Harvard University in 1979.

He joined the faculty at the University of Illinois at Urbana-Champaign in 1981, where he devoted his career to the spectroscopic analysis of intermolecular interactions in neutral and charged molecular clusters. In 2011, after spending nine months at Ruhr University Bochum, he joined the National Science Foundation in Arlington, Virginia as a program officer, a position he held for the next five years. Since then he has participated in the Tokyo Tech World Research Hub Initiative, which fosters interdisciplinary exchange between the world’s top researchers.

He was awarded the status of Fellow in the American Physical Society, after being nominated by their Division of Chemical Physics in 2001, for "his contributions to the field of ion cluster spectroscopy, establishing the connection between gas-phase species with aqueous solutions and biochemical systems, and demonstrating the contribution of internal energy in structural isomerization and dynamics."

== See also ==
- List of fellows of the American Physical Society (1998–2010)
