= VE-Suite =

VE-Suite is an open source based virtual engineering software toolkit that simplifies information management so users can simultaneously interact with engineering analyses and graphical models to create a virtual decision-making environment. It is available under the GNU Lesser General Public License (LGPL) and is composed of four main software engines:

- VE-CE is the software engine responsible for the synchronization of the data between the various analysis and process models and the engineer
- VE-Xplorer is the decision-making environment that allows the engineer to visually interact with the equipment models
- VE-Conductor, the graphical user interface, is the engineer's mechanism to control models and other information
- VE-Open connects the core engines of VE-Suite and transfers data from user-defined information sources to VE-Suite software engines

These software engines coordinate the flow of data from the engineer to the virtual components being designed.

In nearly all aspects of the engineering process—design, manufacturing, and maintenance—the tools employed at each phase rely on virtual models (e.g., software tools) to reduce cost and shorten development time. This results in a variety of software tools being used across a wide range of vendors and engineering firms. In this environment, engineers are required to manually move information from one software package to another. VE-Suite was designed to support real-time, collaborative design using disparate software tools so engineers, designers, and managers can obtain in intuitive feel for a product's performance in real time.

VE-Suite's features include:

Information Management
In engineering decision making, it is necessary to understand the vast amounts of information regarding a particular product. VE-Suite enables users to interact with objects in a virtual space without being concerned with technical information such as costing.

Component Manipulation
Product components are viewable at any scale and can be modified in real time without having to go back to the analysis and modeling process. They can be virtually assembled, much like building a physical model, but without the time and expense; they can be combined to create new components; and they can be distributed across computational resources.

Visualization
VE-Suite provides a virtual reality environment in which users can immerse themselves in the data and better understand it. The ability to visually interact with information allows users to analyze complex patterns, synthesize opportunities, and evaluate alternative processes.

Collaboration
VE-Suite is designed with an open interface to allow the integration of other open-source and commercial software packages. Combining various simulation programs, data from diverse sources, and high fidelity visualization throughout the product development lifecycle produces an experience similar to physical inspection of an actual device. In such an environment, people from various disciplines with diverse but complementary experience can collaborate.

== Workflow ==
Following is an illustration of the VE-Suite workflow. The first VE-Suite tool the engineer works with is VE-Conductor. He or she first double-clicks a particular icon on the right hand tree view, which publishes the object to be investigated on the design canvas in VE-Conductor. The engineer can then double-click on this object to cause a customized graphical user interface (GUI) of this object to appear. Through this interface, the engineer can modify specific input parameters for the particular object under investigation. Once the appropriate values have been set by the engineer, the job is submitted to VE-CE, which schedules the appropriate models for execution and sends the input data to the respective models. Once the models have been executed, the data generated by the models is accessible in VE-Xplorer within the graphical decision-making environment.

Everything that has occurred up to this point has occurred without user intervention; the software tools contained within VE-Suite have handled the information integration and model execution. Once the model execution is complete, the engineer can then choose to interrogate the high fidelity data by requesting volume renders, vector planes, contour planes, streamlines, animated massless particles, or transient animations if the data is transient. During this workflow process, the engineer interacts with VE-Conductor and visually interacts with the data in the VE-Xplorer-generated graphical decision-making environment. The complexity of information integration and execution of the distributed models is handled without input from the engineer.
