= Modal analysis using FEM =

Computational analysis of vibrations

The goal of modal analysis in structural mechanics is to determine the natural mode shapes and frequencies of an object or structure during free vibration. It is common to use the finite element method (FEM) to perform this analysis because, like other calculations using the FEM, the object being analyzed can have arbitrary shape and the results of the calculations are acceptable. The types of equations which arise from modal analysis are those seen in eigensystems. The physical interpretation of the eigenvalues and eigenvectors which come from solving the system are that they represent the frequencies and corresponding mode shapes. Sometimes, the only desired modes are the lowest frequencies because they can be the most prominent modes at which the object will vibrate, dominating all the higher frequency modes.

It is also possible to test a physical object to determine its natural frequencies and mode shapes. This is called an Experimental Modal Analysis. The results of the physical test can be used to calibrate a finite element model to determine if the underlying assumptions made were correct (for example, correct material properties and boundary conditions were used).

== FEA eigensystems ==
For the most basic problem involving a linear elastic material which obeys Hooke's law, the matrix equations take the form of a dynamic three-dimensional spring mass system. The generalized equation of motion is given as:

$$[M] [\ddot U] +
[C] [\dot U] +
[K] [U] =
[F]$$

where $[M]$ is the mass matrix, $[\ddot U]$ is the 2nd time derivative of the displacement $[U]$ (i.e., the acceleration), $[\dot U]$ is the velocity, $[C]$ is a damping matrix, $[K]$ is the stiffness matrix, and $[F]$ is the force vector. The general problem, with nonzero damping, is a quadratic eigenvalue problem. However, for vibrational modal analysis, the damping is generally ignored, leaving only the 1st and 3rd terms on the left hand side:

$$[M] [\ddot U] + [K] [U]  = [0]$$

This is the general form of the eigensystem encountered in structural engineering using the FEM. To represent the free-vibration solutions of the structure, harmonic motion is assumed. This assumption means that $[\ddot U]$ is taken to equal $\lambda [U]$, where $\lambda$ is an eigenvalue (with units of reciprocal time squared, e.g., $\mathrm{s}^{-2}$). Using this, the equation reduces to:

$$[M][U] \lambda + [K][U] = [0]$$

In contrast, the equation for static problems is:

$$[K][U] = [F]$$

which is expected when all terms having a time derivative are set to zero.

=== Comparison to linear algebra ===
In linear algebra, it is more common to see the standard form of an eigensystem which is expressed as:

$$[A][x] = [x]\lambda$$

Both equations can be seen as the same because if the general equation is multiplied through by the inverse of the mass, $[M]^{-1}$, it will take the form of the latter. Because the lower modes are desired, solving the system more likely involves the equivalent of multiplying through by the inverse of the stiffness, $[K]^{-1}$, a process called inverse iteration. When this is done, the resulting eigenvalues, $\mu$, relate to that of the original by:

$$\mu =  \frac{1}{\lambda}$$

but the eigenvectors are the same.

== See also ==
- Finite element method
- Finite element method in structural mechanics
- Modal analysis
- Seismic analysis
- Structural Dynamics
- Eigensystem
- Eigenmode
- Quadratic eigenvalue problem
