= Armatix iP1 =

Semi-automatic pistol and Smart Gun prototype

- Type: Semi-automatic pistol, smart gun
- Place of origin: Germany

Production history
- Designer: Armatix GmbH
- Designed: 2006
- Manufacturer: Armatix GmbH

Specifications
- Mass: 518 grams (without magazine)The iW1 controls the handgun through radio-frequency identification (RFID).
- Length: 175 mm
- Cartridge: .22 LR
- Effective firing range: 69 m (75 yd)
- Feed system: 10-round detachable box magazine

The Armatix iP1 is a magazine-fed, semi-automatic pistol which uses smart gun technology. The pistol is chambered for the .22 Long Rifle rimfire cartridge. It is designed and manufactured by the German company Armatix. The iP1 is marketed as a James Bond-style handgun that can only be fired by an authorized user.

== Specifications ==
The Armatix iP1 weighs 518 grams (18.3 oz) without a loaded magazine. The pistol is chambered in .22 LR caliber and is fed via a 10-round detachable box magazine, and has an effective range of 75 yards (69 m). Other features of the handgun include an electronic magazine disconnect, color coded safety, integrated grip safety, and an interface for additional applications such as a camera.

The iP1 handgun and the W1 Active RFID watch form a smart system in which both parts communicate through radio-frequency identification (RFID). In order for the handgun to function, the matching watch must be within 10 inches (25 cm) of it. The Armatix iP1 cannot be used without the matching iW1 Active RFID wristwatch.

The wristwatch indicates, among other data, the charge level of the watch and the handgun and the number of shots fired within a given time frame. In addition, the watch can deactivate the firearm by means of a time-control feature. The Target Response System (TRS) can be controlled to fire only toward a recognized target or “permitted” target, and the handgun cannot be fired if it is aimed away from the target. This Target Control module is an optional feature.

== Reception ==
Attempts to mandate "smart gun" technology in the United States have been met with opposition from gun rights organizations. The National Rifle Association of America argued that "Failed attempts to develop and market ‘smart guns’ have been going on for years. NRA does not oppose new technological developments in firearms; however, we are opposed to government mandates that require the use of expensive, unreliable features, such as grips that would read your fingerprints before the gun will fire."

In 2002, the state of New Jersey passed a Childproof Handgun Law intended to eventually mandate that all guns sold in the state be smart guns. The law will take effect "three years after it is determined that personalized handguns are available for retail purposes"; as such, gun rights lobbyists have contended that attempts to market a smart gun in the country would trigger the law. In March 2014, the California-based Oak Tree Gun Club was criticized for selling the iP1 at its shop, with lobbyists citing the New Jersey law to argue that its owners were acting against U.S. citizens' Second Amendment rights to keep and bear arms. Despite evidence to the contrary, the club denied that it had offered the gun. Similar threats, including death threats, were received in May 2014 by an owner of Engage Armaments in Maryland. He also stopped selling the gun, arguing that the pro-gun lobby groups' actions were hypocritical, as they "are not supposed to say a gun should be prohibited. Then you are being no different from the anti-gun people who say an AR-15 should be prohibited."

In November 2014, John Jay Hoffman, the Attorney General of New Jersey, released a report to the governor and the legislature that said: "After careful consideration of the iP1′s design, we have determined that it does not satisfy the statutory definition because, as a matter of design, the pistol may be fired by a person who is not an authorized or recognized user. That is, as long as the pistol is situated within 10 inches of the enabling wristwatch, it may be fired by anyone – the authorized user or any other person who is able to pull the trigger."

== Review ==
An August 2014 review, based on testing conducted in May 2014, was published in America's 1st Freedom. While the review praised the pistol for its "sleek, ergonomic appearance", paddle-style magazine release, and its "decent" single-action trigger pull, and called its magazine "good quality", it was mostly critical. It said that the pistol was unreliable (failing to get through an entire 10-round magazine even once), and had an "off the scale" (~25 lbs) double-action trigger pull. It also criticized the pistol's recessed hammer, which does not allow much purchase on the hammer if the user attempts to decock the pistol with their thumb on the hammer (though the review called this "ill-advised" with any design). Finally, it criticized the pistol's color-coded LED indicators, where red means safe and green means fire. It said that this is inconsistent with other firearms' safety colors, where red means "ready to fire". The review also hypothesized that the pistol would not be waterproof, though this was not tested.

An accompanying article called the gun "disappointing at best, and alarming at worst", and criticized the firearm's "kill switch" functionality, which can allow the firearm to be disabled by a third party. It also criticized the time it took to initially pair the pistol with the watch (20 minutes with the help of a professional), and the time it takes to start the pistol up after it has been paired with a watch (12 seconds). It also said that the pistol had "the worst double-action trigger we’ve ever tested" and criticized the pistol's price of $1798 (for the pistol and the watch together), which was four-and-a-half to five times as expensive as comparable models from other manufacturers.
