= New Jersey Childproof Handgun Law =

The New Jersey Childproof Handgun Law, also known as P.L.2002, c.130, was a now-repealed law that would restrict the sale of handguns in New Jersey to smart guns that "can only be fired by an authorized or recognized user" and would take effect three years after the technology is available for retail purposes. It has been a controversial issue for the National Rifle Association of America and many gun owners because of its restrictions and the unusual move that "legislates a product that does not exist".

On July 16, 2019 Gov. Murphy signed into law a bill which repealed substantially all of the original Childproof Handgun Law and replaced it with a requirement that after the state Attorney General approves a production model each firearms retailer in the state would be required to carry and display at least one smart gun on their shelves with "a sign... disclosing the features of personalized handguns that are not offered by traditional handguns".

== History ==
The bill was introduced in the New Jersey Senate on January 8, 2002, as Bill S573/890 and was signed into law on December 23 of that year. It was a bipartisan bill whose primary sponsors were Democrats Matt Ahearn, Richard Codey, John Girgenti and Loretta Weinberg, and Republicans Peter Inverso and Joseph Palaia. The bill provided a timetable for implementation. Specifically:

The amended bill specifies that three years after it is determined that personalized handguns are available for retail purposes, it will be illegal for any registered or licensed firearms manufacturer or dealer to transport, sell, expose for sale, possess for sale, assign or transfer any handgun unless that handgun is a personalized handgun.

Numerous parties blamed the law for causing research into smartgun technologies to stop. Inc. columnist Joseph Steinberg also criticized the naming of the law as "a terrible misnomer that insinuates that smartguns are somehow childproof, a notion that might encourage owners not to treat the weapons with the same care as they would conventional weapons."

In 2014, the introduction of the Armatix iP1, which can identify authorized users via an electronic bracelet, rekindled debate regarding the law. Death threats were received in May 2014 by an owner of Engage Armaments in Maryland, who was considering selling the gun but eventually backed off. On May 2, 2014, New Jersey Senate Majority Leader Loretta Weinberg said she would introduce a bill repealing the 2002 law if the National Rifle Association would agree not to stand in the way of smart gun technology.

On May 19, 2014, the Brady Campaign to Prevent Gun Violence and the local chapter of the Million Mom March sued the state of New Jersey, claiming none of the required quarterly reports on the status of personalized guns were filed between at least 2004 and 2012. They said in a statement:

New Jersey law requires the attorney general to report on the availability of personal handgun technology, and that law hasn't been complied with for 10 years. It's particularly important now because there's evidence that personalized handguns have been available for sale in at least two locations.

In November 2014, the Attorney General opined that the existing smart guns do not meet the requirements of the law.

== See also ==
- Gun politics in the United States
- Gun laws in New Jersey
