= Dynamic amplification factor =

Dimensionless number in physics

Dynamic Amplification Factor (DAF) or Dynamic Increase Factor (DIF), is a dimensionless number which describes how many times the deflections or stresses should be multiplied to the deflections or stresses caused by the static loads when a dynamic load is applied on to a structure.

When lifting an object during a sub-sea operation, the DAF is calculated based on dynamic hydraulic forces or on snap-forces.

$$DAF = \frac{{F_{total}}}{{Mg}}$$

Where:

$M$ is the mass of the object in air (kg)
$g$ is the acceleration of gravity (9.81m/s2)
$F_{total}$ is the largest of ${F_{static-max} + F_{hyd}}$ or $F_{static-max} + F_{snap}$ (N)
