= Neuron Data =

American software development company

Neuron Data is an American software development company that was founded June 1985 by Alain Rappaport, Patrick Perez and Jean-Marie Chauvet. Their first product, Nexpert, was a C-based, goal-oriented backward chaining and data-driven forward chaining expert system shell for the Macintosh in 1985. The product was ported to the PC, one of the first programs to run under the then nascent Windows. Under the name Nexpert Object, it was further ported to VAX VMS and all flavors of UNIX workstations, as well as on IBM mainframes.

In 1991, Neuron Data released a GUI building tool named Open Interface. The Open Interface Elements development tool won the 1995 Editor's Choice Award from X Journal for the Best Cross-Platform Toolkit.

Neuron Data produced a client-server software development environment named C/S Elements in 1993. The following year, they released Smart Elements, which incorporated support for business rules, enhanced GUI design tools and direct support of external C++ libraries. In 1995 they released Elements Environment, a middleware suite of object-oriented tools that can be used to build distributed applications. Web Element, a component of the version 2.0 Elements Environment, allowed interaction of developed applications with the World Wide Web.

In order to improve their Java interface development skills, in 1997 Neuron Data acquired the software component company Microline Software. On March 23, 2000, the company was taken public by CEO Thomas F. Kelly; the company name was changed to Blaze Software, with Nasdaq code BLZE. It was then acquired by German software company Brokat. They were sold to HNC, Inc., which, in turn, merged with FICO in 2002.

== Products ==
- Nexpert
- Nexpert Object
- NExtra
- Open Interface
- Elements Environment
- Blaze Advisor
