= Superelement =

In scientific computing and computational engineering, a superelement is a finite element method technique which consists of defining a new type of finite element by grouping and processing a set of finite elements. A superelement describes a part of a problem, and can be locally solved, before being implemented in the global problem. Substructuring a problem by means of superelements may facilitate the division of labor and overcome computer memory limitations.

== History ==
Superelements were invented in the aerospace industry, where complexity and the size of problems exceeded the solving capabilities of the computational hardware. The development of superelements made solving of larger problems possible, by breakdown of complex systems such as complete airplanes.
