= Test effort =

In software development, test effort refers to the expenses for (still to come) tests. There is a relation with test costs and failure costs (direct, indirect, costs for fault correction). Some factors which influence test effort are: maturity of the software development process, quality and testability of the testobject, test infrastructure, skills of staff members, quality goals and test strategy.

== Methods for estimation of the test effort ==
To analyse all factors is difficult, because most of the factors influence each other. Following approaches can be used for the estimation: top-down estimation and bottom-up estimation. The top-down techniques are formula based and they are relative to the expenses for development: Function Point Analysis (FPA) and Test Point Analysis (TPA) amongst others. Bottom-up techniques are based on detailed information and involve often experts. The following techniques belong here: Work Breakdown Structure (WBS) and Wide Band Delphi (WBD).

We can also use the following techniques for estimating the test effort:

- Conversion of software size into person hours of effort directly using a conversion factor. For example, we assign 2 person hours of testing effort per one Function Point of software size or 4 person hours of testing effort per one use case point or 3 person hours of testing effort per one Software Size Unit
- Conversion of software size into testing project size such as Test Points or Software Test Units using a conversion factor and then convert testing project size into effort
- Compute testing project size using Test Points of Software Test Units. Methodology for deriving the testing project size in Test Points is not well documented. However, methodology for deriving Software Test Units is defined in a paper by Murali
- We can also derive software testing project size and effort using Delphi Technique or Analogy Based Estimation technique.

== Test efforts from literature ==
In literature test efforts relative to total costs are between 20% and 70%. These values are amongst others dependent from the project specific conditions. When looking for the test effort in the single phases of the test process, these are diversely distributed: with about 40% for test specification and test execution each.
