= Smart system =

Adaptive intelligent systems

Smart systems are systems (usually computer systems or electronic system) which are able to incorporate and perform functions of sensing, actuation, and control in order to analyze a situation, based on acquired data and perform decisions in a predictive or adaptive manner, thereby performing smart actions. In most cases the Intelligence/"smartness" of the system can be attributed to autonomous operation based on closed loop control, resource management, and networking capabilities.

== Characteristics ==
Smart systems typically consist of diverse components:

- Sensors for signal acquisition
- Elements transmitting the information to the command-and-control unit
- Command-and-control units that take decisions and give instructions based on the available information
- Components transmitting decisions and instructions
- Actuators that perform or trigger the required action

=== Development ===
A lot of smart systems evolved from microsystems. They combine technologies and components from microsystems technology (miniaturized electric, mechanical, optical, and fluidic devices) with other disciplines like biology, chemistry, nanoscience, or cognitive sciences.

There are three generations of smart systems:

- First-generation smart systems: object recognition devices, driver status monitoring, and multifunctional devices for minimally invasive surgery
- Second-generation smart systems: active miniaturized artificial organs like cochlear implants or artificial pancreas, advanced energy management systems, and environmental sensor networks
- Third-generation smart systems: combine technical “intelligence” and cognitive functions so that they can provide an interface between the virtual and the physical world

=== Challenges ===
The integration of various components manufactured using different kind of technologies and materials is a primary difficulty faced in smart systems technology. Focus is on the design and manufacturing of completely new marketable products and services for specialized applications (e.g., in medical technologies), and for mass market applications (e.g., in the automotive industries).

In an industrial context, and when emphasizing the combination of components with the aim of merging their functional and technical abilities into an interoperable system, the term "smart systems integration" is used. This term reflects the industrial requirement and particular challenge of integrating different technologies, component sizes, and materials into one system.

The systems approach calls for integrated design and manufacturing and has to bring together interdisciplinary technological approaches and solutions (converging technologies). Manufacturing companies as well as research institutes therefore face challenges in terms of specialized technological know-how, skilled labor, design tools, and equipment needed for the research, design and manufacturing of integrated smart systems.

== Applications area for smart systems ==
Smart systems address environmental, societal, and economic challenges like limited resources, climate change, population ageing, and globalization. They are for that reason increasingly used in a large number of sectors. Key sectors in this context are transportation, healthcare, energy, safety and security, logistics, ICT, and manufacturing.

=== Environment ===
In terms of environmental challenges, smart solutions for energy management and distribution, smart control of electrical drives, smart logistics, or energy-efficient facility management could, by 2020, reduce global emissions by 23%, with an equivalent of 9.2 Gt CO_{2}e.

=== Automotive sector ===
In the automotive sector, smart systems integration will be a key enabler for pre-crash systems and predictive driver assistance features to reach the goal of the Road Safety Action Plan to halve the number of traffic deaths by 2020. Furthermore, smart systems are considered fundamental for sustainable and energy-efficient mobility, e.g., hybrid and electric traction.

=== Internet of Things ===
Smart systems also contribute to the development of the future Internet of Things, in that they provide smart functionality to everyday objects, e.g., to industrial goods in the supply chain, or to food products in the food supply chain. With the help of active RFID technology, wireless sensors, real-time sense and response capability, energy efficiency, as well as networking functionality, objects will become smart objects. Smart industrial goods could store information about their origin, destination, components, and use and waste disposal could become an efficient individual recycling process.

Armatix developed a pistol that uses an RFID-active wristwatch to function.

=== Healthcare ===
In the healthcare sector, smart systems technology leads to better diagnostic tools, to better treatment and quality of life for patients by simultaneously reducing costs of public healthcare systems. Key developments in this sector are smart miniaturized devices and artificial organs like artificial pancreas or cochlear implants.

For example, Lab-on-a-chip devices have biochemical sensors that detect specific molecular markers in body fluids or tissue. They can include multiple functionalities such as sample taking, sample preparation, and sample pre-treatment, data processing, and storage, implantable systems which can be reabsorbed by the body after use, non-invasive sensors based on transdermal principles, or devices for responsive administration of medication. In healthcare, smart systems often operate autonomously and within networks, because those systems are able to provide real-time monitoring, diagnosis, interaction with other devices, and communication with the patient or physician.

== See also ==
- Internet of Things
- Machine learning
- Microbotics
- RoboBee
- Smart grid
- Smart city
- Smart home
- Microelectromechanical systems
- Artificial Intelligence of Things
