= Modeshape =

Mode shapes in physics are specific patterns of vibration that a structure or system can exhibit when it oscillates at its natural frequencies. These patterns describe the relative displacement of different parts of the system during vibration.

In applied mathematics, mode shapes are a manifestation of eigenvectors which describe the relative displacement of two or more elements in a mechanical system or wave front. A mode shape is a deflection pattern related to a particular natural frequency and represents the relative displacement of all parts of a structure for that particular mode.

== Mathematical derivation ==
Mode shapes have a mathematical meaning as 'eigenvectors' or 'eigenfunctions' of the eigenvalue problem which arises, studying particular solutions of the partial differential equation of a system.

== See also ==
- Normal mode
- Harmonic oscillator
