= Modal testing =

Modal testing is the form of vibration testing of an object whereby the natural (modal) frequencies, modal masses, modal damping ratios and mode shapes of the object under test are determined.

== Phases ==
A modal test consists of an acquisition phase and an analysis phase. The complete process is often referred to as a Modal Analysis or Experimental Modal Analysis.

== Methods ==
Impact hammer testing and shaker (vibration tester) testing are commonplace. In both cases energy is supplied to the system with a known frequency content. Structural resonances amplify the response, clearly seen in the response spectra. Using the response and force spectra, a transfer function can be obtained. The transfer function (or frequency response function (FRF)) is often curve-fitted to estimate modal parameters; however, other methods of modal parameter estimation are available and it is the topic of much research.

Key components for performing experimental modal analysis.

=== Impact hammer testing ===
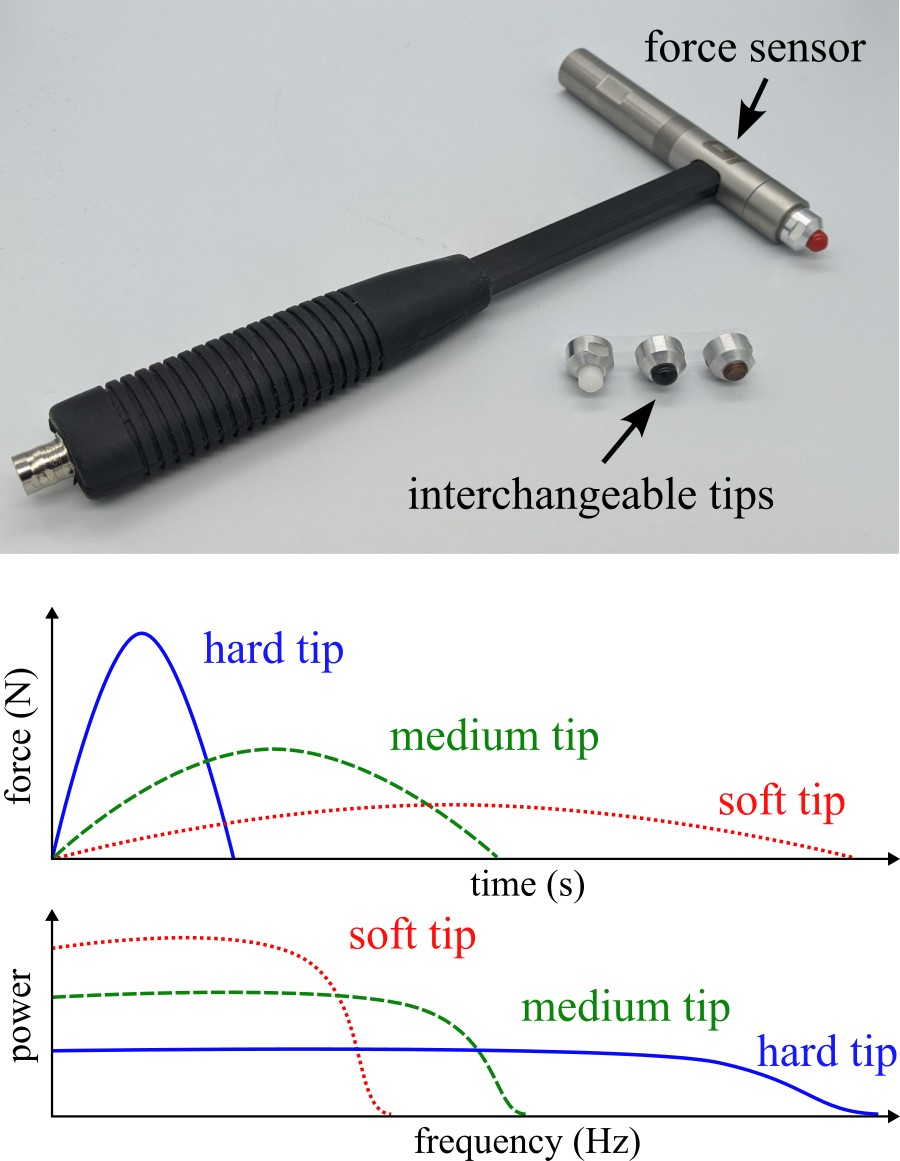
Modal impact hammer with interchangeable tips and accompanying temporal and frequency responses

An ideal impact to a structure is a perfect impulse, of infinitely small duration, which causes a constant amplitude in the frequency domain; this would excite all modes of vibration with equal energy. The impact hammer test is designed to replicate this; however, in reality a hammer strike cannot achieve an infinitely small duration, but has a known contact time. The duration of the contact time directly influences the frequency content of the force, with a larger contact time reducing bandwidth. A load cell is attached to the end of the hammer to record the force. Impact hammer testing is ideal for small, lightweight structures. However, as the size of the structure increases, issues can occur due to a poor signal-to-noise ratio, which is common on large civil engineering structures.

=== Shaker modal testing ===
A shaker is a device that excites the object or structure according to its amplified input signal. Several input signals are available for modal testing, but the sine sweep and random frequency vibration profiles are the most common.

Small objects or structures are attached to the shaker table. With some types of shakers, an armature is often attached to the body to be tested by way of piano wire (pulling force) or stinger (pushing force). When the signal is transmitted through the piano wire or the stinger, the object responds the same way as impact testing, by attenuating some and amplifying certain frequencies. These frequencies are measured as modal frequencies. Usually a load cell is placed between the shaker and the structure to create the excitation force.

For large civil engineering structures much larger shakers are used, which can have a mass of 100 kg and above, and are able to apply a force of many hundreds of newtons. Several types of shakers are common:

- rotating mass shakers,
- electrodynamic shakers,
- electrohydraulic shakers.

For rotating mass shakers, the force can be calculated by knowing the mass and the speed of rotation, while for electrodynamic shakers, the force can be obtained through a load cell or an accelerometer placed on the moving mass of the shaker. Shakers have an advantage over the impact hammer as they can supply more energy to a structure over a longer interval. However, problems can also be introduced; shakers can influence the dynamic properties of the structure and can also increase the complexity of analysis due to windowing errors.

== See also ==
- Modal Analysis
- Vibration
- Cushioning
- Shock absorber
- Shock (mechanics)
- Shock response spectrum
- Shaker (testing device)
