= Smart gun =

Concept firearm designed to reduce the misuse of firearms

A smart gun, also called a smart-gun, or smartgun, is a firearm that can detect it is being used by authorized user(s) or in an authorized location. Various designs have been proposed to prevent accidental discharge and criminal misuse of firearms. The term is also used in science fiction to refer to various types of firearms with self-aiming capabilities or which use smart bullets.

User-specific smart guns typically employ RFID chips or other proximity tokens. They are intended to prevent accidental shootings (e.g. by children), gun thefts, and criminal usage by persons not authorized to use the guns.

Location-based guns implement geofencing via GPS; a wireless signal from a base station or a motion-activated time lock to prevent usage if the firearm is stolen or otherwise removed from its authorized location.

Related to smart guns are other smart firearms safety devices such as biometric or RFID activated accessories and safes.

== Commercial availability ==
No smart gun has ever been sold on the commercial market in the United States. The Armatix iP1, a .22 caliber handgun with an active RFID watch used to unlock it, is the most mature smart gun developed. It was briefly planned to be offered at a few retailers before being quickly withdrawn due to pressure from gun-rights advocates concerned that it would trigger the New Jersey Childproof Handgun Law.

As of 2019, a number of startups and companies including Armatix, Biofire, LodeStar Firearms, and Swiss company SAAR are purportedly developing various smart handguns and rifles, but none have brought the technology to market.

== Operating Principles ==
=== User-specific guns ===
User-specific smart guns cannot be fired unless unlocked by an authorized user. Proposed mechanisms are mostly proximity-based, where the firearm activates in the presence of a corresponding RFID tag contained in a watch, bracelet, ring or other jewellery worn by the user, or embedded in the user's skin.

Miniaturised electronics have raised the possibility of firearms which activate based on a biometric challenge, such as a user's fingerprints.

=== Location-based guns ===
Since the 1980s, several patents have been filed describing firearms that can only be used within a location, or for a short period of time after being moved. The intention is that firearms can be held for home defense but will deactivate if removed from the home.

One patent describes a firearm that cannot be fired unless it has remained motionless for a relatively long time, e.g. 24 hours. Following that time period, there is only a relatively short time period that it can be fired after being picked up for use, e.g. 5 minutes. After its firing time period expires, it must undergo its motionless period again to allow firing. Consequently, the usefulness of this gun is restricted to locations relatively close to where it is kept, e.g. its owner's property. A demonstration model having timing and movement sensing circuitry was produced in 1989 but not marketed commercially.

Later patents describe locationized guns that cannot fire unless they are in range of a signal that enables the gun, or else using a system of radio frequency triangulation such as GPS or cell phone signals to determine its location.< Firing is allowed only if the gun's location is electronically determined to be within the area stored in memory of where its firing is allowed, such as a home, business, or hunting area.

== Reception ==
Reception to the concept of smart gun technology has been mixed. There have been public calls to develop the technology, most notably from President Obama. Gun-rights groups including the National Rifle Association of America (NRA) have expressed concerns that the technology could be mandated, and some firearms owners are concerned that the technology wouldn't be reliable enough to trust.

=== National Rifle Association of America ===
The NRA and its membership boycotted Smith & Wesson after it was revealed in 1999 that the company was developing a smart gun for the U.S. government.

The official position of the NRA-ILA (the lobbying arm of the NRA) with regards to smart guns, is: "The NRA doesn't oppose the development of 'smart' guns, nor the ability of Americans to voluntarily acquire them. However, NRA opposes any law prohibiting Americans from acquiring or possessing firearms that don't possess "smart" gun technology."

=== Law enforcement ===
Some smart gun proponents have called for federal, state, and local police organizations to take the lead on adopting smart gun technology, either voluntarily or via purchasing mandate. There has been scattered support for voluntary test programs from some law enforcement leaders, including San Francisco Police Chief Greg Suhr, who has said, "Officer safety is huge, so you wouldn't want to compel that upon officers. But we have so many officers who are so into technology, I am all but certain there are officers that would be willing to do such a pilot.".

Richard Beary, president of the International Association of Chiefs of Police, said there would be "plenty of agencies interested in beta testing the technology" and that "[a smart gun] can't be 99 percent accurate, it has to be 100 percent accurate. It has to work every single time." James Pasco, executive director of the Fraternal Order of Police, which represents 325,000 officers nationwide, has stated, "I don't think that police officers, or anybody for that matter, should be guinea pigs for untested, deadly weapons,"

=== New Jersey mandate ===
In the United States, New Jersey passed the Childproof Handgun Bill into state law on December 23, 2002, which would have required that all guns sold in the state of New Jersey have a mechanism to prevent unauthorized users from firing it, taking effect three years after such a smart gun is approved by the state. Weapons used by law enforcement officers would be exempt from the smart gun requirement. In July 2019, Governor Phil Murphy signed into law a bill which repealed substantially all of the original Childproof Handgun Law and replaced it with a requirement that after the state Attorney General approves a production model each firearms retailer in the state would be required to carry and display at least one smart gun on their shelves with "a sign... disclosing the features of personalized handguns that are not offered by traditional handguns".

The potential effects of New Jersey's smart gun law has also influenced opposition to the technology in the United States; two attempts to sell the Armatix iP1 smart gun in California and Maryland were met with opposition from gun rights groups, who argued that allowing the gun to be sold in the United States would trigger the law. In December 2014, the Attorney General of New Jersey determined that the Armatix iP1 would not meet the legal criteria sufficient to trigger the mandate.

=== Reliability concerns ===
Many firearm advocates object to smart guns on a philosophical and regulatory basis. Gun ownership advocate Kenneth W. Royce, writing under the pen name of "Boston T. Party", wrote that "no defensive firearm should ever rely upon any technology more advanced than Newtonian physics. That includes batteries, radio links, encryption, scanning devices and microcomputers."

TechCrunch technology and outdoors journalist Jon Stokes summarizes the reliability concerns with smart guns stating,

"First, no electronic technology is 100% reliable, and very few people will trust a gun that can be turned into a brick by a failure of some on-board circuitry. Second, whenever you attach software to some new category of things — especially software that has any kind of connection to the outside world, whether via RFID or an actual network — then in addition to whatever problems that thing had before, you've introduced a whole host of brand new security and identity problems that are new to that thing and that must be discovered and patched, and then the patches will have problems that must be discovered and patched, and on it goes."

== Potential advantages ==
=== Gun owners ===
User-specific firearm safety technology is intended to prevent the accidental use and misuse of firearms by children and teens, as well as reducing accidental discharges or the use of a firearm against its owner if the firearm is stolen or taken away. Smart guns may also reduce incidents of suicide by unauthorized users of a firearm.

Location-based guns are argued to satisfy the right to possess arms for defense of homes and businesses while being useless for the commission of crimes away from those homes and businesses, or in gang-related violence. Theft of firearms is deterred by the firearm's being deactivated on removal.

=== Law enforcement ===
Law enforcement applications also hold promise; San Francisco Police Chief Greg Suhr went on record supporting smart guns for their potential to reduce the risk of having a law enforcement officer's gun used against him or her, and for rendering stolen guns unfireable. Richard Beary, president of the International Association of Chiefs of Police, was quoted in the Washington Post as saying there would be "plenty of agencies interested in beta testing the [smart gun] technology."

In October 2013 the European Commission published a document by commissioner Cecilia Malmström, stating that "the Commission will work with the firearms industry to explore technological solutions, such as biometric sensors where personal data is stored in the firearm, for ensuring that purchased firearms may only be used by their legal owner. It will carry out a detailed cost-benefit analysis on the question of making such 'smart gun' security features mandatory for firearms lawfully sold in the EU."

An advantage of proposed location-based guns depends on them having electronic circuitry and electronic control over firing. Those technologies make it relatively easy to design them to communicate with a Cellular network or other communication system to provide discharge information or to be externally prevented from firing regardless of location. This could allow Police to disable firearms in an area during operations and locate stolen firearms.

== Potential disadvantages ==
Joseph Steinberg writes that "biometrics take time to process and are often inaccurate – especially when a user is under duress – as is likely going to be the case in any situation in which he needs to brandish a gun.... it is not ideal to add a requirement for power to devices utilized in cases of emergency that did not need electricity previously. How many fire codes allow fire extinguishers that require a battery to operate?" Steinberg further writes that "smartguns might be hackable" or "susceptible to government tracking or jamming...Firearms must be able to be disassembled in order to be cleaned and maintained. One of the principles of information security is that someone who has physical access to a machine can undermine its security."[39] In a follow-up piece published in January 2016, Steinberg noted that smartguns that utilize wireless communications to detect that the shooter is wearing a watch, bracelet, or other device may "allow criminals (and police) to identify who is carrying a weapon" undermining "one of the reasons that some states require people to carry their weapons concealed; if all civilian-carried guns are concealed, criminals do not know who is carrying and who is not, so they have to fear mugging everyone, which protects the unarmed as well as the armed."[40]

According to an article in NRA outlet "America's First Freedom", other concerns are that smart guns may make a firearm more likely to fail when needed for self-defense. "Batteries go dead, temperature or moisture can harm electronics and many 'smart gun' designs, such as Armatix's iP1, require that a person wear a watch, bracelet, or other device." Smart guns may also take considerable time to be ready for firing from a "cold start."

Locationized guns would not prevent misuse (e.g. by children) within an authorized location and require additional access controls.

== In science fiction ==
Smart guns are commonly used in science fiction, where they may not only have biometric identification, but also have auto-aiming capabilities or smart bullets. A prominent example is the Lawgiver used by Judge Dredd, which is linked to his DNA. Another is the M56 Smart Gun from Aliens, which is carried via a waist-mounted robotic arm. The concept was later used in a U.S. Army prototype, although engineers moved the mount from the waist to the back, due to ergonomic issues.
