= Open Interface =

Cross-platform graphical user interface toolkit

A toolkit that can give applications the look of several major windowing environments running on several different operating systems is something of a programmer's dream.
—Open Interface Grants Programmer's Wishes, InfoWorld (1991)

Open Interface was an early cross-platform graphical user interface toolkit by Neuron Data. Released in March 1991, Open Interface featured a WYSIWYG editor and supported DOS, Macintosh, OS/2, VMS, Microsoft Windows 3.0, and other platforms. The toolkit made use of widgets and produced ANSI C code.

The product was well received and considered an industry standard at the time.

Neuron Data sold the rights to the product to HCL where it continues its life under the Presenter5 name.

== Awards ==
- X Journal 1995 Editor's Choice Award
