= Shaker (testing device) =

Device used in vibration testing

A shaker is a device used in vibration testing to excite the structure, either for endurance testing or modal testing.

Sample layout of a modal testing system

== See also ==
- Vibration
