= Finite element updating =

Finite element model updating is the process of ensuring that finite element analysis results in models that better reflect the measured data than the initial models. It is part of verification and validation of numerical models.

== The process ==
The process is conducted by first choosing the domain in which data is presented. The domains used include time domain, frequency domain, modal domain, and time-frequency domain.

The second step is to determine which parts of the initial models are thought to have been modeled incorrectly.

The third task is to formulate a function which has the parameters that are expected to be design variables, and which represents the distance between the measured data and the finite element model predicted data.

The fourth step is to implement the optimization method to identify parameters that minimize this function. In most cases, a gradient-based optimization strategy will be used. For nonlinear analysis, more specific methods like response surface modeling, particle swarm optimization, Monte Carlo optimization, and genetic algorithms can be used. Recently, finite element model updating has been conducted using Bayesian statistics which gives a probabilistic interpretation of model updating.
