= Structural dynamics =

Behavior of structures subjected to time-varying loading

Structural dynamics is a branch of structural analysis which covers the behavior of a structure subjected to dynamic loading. Dynamic loading is any time-varying loading which changes quickly enough that the response of the structure differs from the response to the same loading applied statically. Causes of dynamic loading include people, wind, waves, traffic, earthquakes, and blasts. Dynamic analysis can be used to find dynamic displacements, time history, and natural frequencies and mode shapes.

Whether a given load should be treated as static or dynamic depends on how quickly the load varies in comparison to the structure's natural frequency. If it changes slowly, the structure's response may be determined with static analysis, but if it varies quickly (relative to the structure's ability to respond), the response must be determined with a dynamic analysis.

Dynamic analysis for simple structures can be carried out analytically, but for complex structures finite element analysis is more often used to calculate the mode shapes and frequencies.

== Applications ==
Structural dynamics is applied in a number of engineering fields, including

- Earthquake engineering
- Wind engineering
- Coastal engineering
- Human-structure interaction in structural engineering.

== Dynamic loading ==
Structural analysis is mainly concerned with finding out the behavior (forces or displacements) of a physical structure when subjected to force. This action can be in the form of load due to the weight of things such as people, furniture, wind, snow, etc. or some other kind of excitation such as an earthquake, shaking of the ground due to a blast nearby, etc. All loads are dynamic in the literal sense, because at some point in time they were not present. The distinction is made between the dynamic and the static analysis on the basis of whether the applied action has enough acceleration in comparison to the structure's natural frequency. If a load is applied sufficiently slowly, the inertia forces (Newton's first law of motion) can be ignored and the analysis can be simplified as static analysis.

Dynamic loads on a structure can be categorized as periodic or non-periodic. Periodic loads may be simple harmonic, as in the case of a rotating machine with an unbalanced flywheel (a familiar example is a washing machine operating at a steady speed), or they may be more complex but representable by a Fourier series. Non-periodic loads include impulsive (very short duration) loading caused by blasts or impacts, and longer duration loads including earthquakes and wind. In the case of random excitation, the amplitude-time history of the load and the structural response are defined in terms of statistical distributions.

== Displacements ==
A dynamic load can have a significantly larger effect than a static load of the same magnitude due to the structure's inability to respond quickly to the loading (by deflecting). The increase in the effect of a dynamic load is given by the dynamic amplification factor (DAF) or dynamic load factor (DLF):

$$\text{DAF} = \text{DLF} = \frac{u_{\max}}{u_\text{static}}$$

where u is the deflection of the structure due to the applied load.

Graphs of dynamic amplification factors vs non-dimensional rise time (t_{r}/T) exist for standard loading functions (for an explanation of rise time, see time history analysis below). Hence the DAF for a given loading can be read from the graph, the static deflection can be easily calculated for simple structures and the dynamic deflection found.

== Time history analysis ==
A full time history will give the response of a structure over time during and after the application of a load. To find the full time history of a structure's response, you must solve the structure's equation of motion.

=== Example ===
Single degree of freedom system: simple mass spring model

A simple single degree of freedom system (a mass, M, on a spring of stiffness k, for example) has the following equation of motion:

$$M \ddot{x} + kx = F(t)$$

where $\ddot{x}$ is the acceleration (the double derivative of the displacement) and x is the displacement.

If the loading F(t) is a Heaviside step function (the sudden application of a constant load), the solution to the equation of motion is:

$$x = \frac{F_0} k [1 - \cos(\omega t)]$$

where $\omega = \sqrt{\frac{k}{M}}$ and the fundamental natural frequency, $f = \frac {\omega}{2\pi}$.

The static deflection of a single degree of freedom system is:

$$x_\text{static} = \frac{F_0}{k}$$

so we can write, by combining the above formulae:

$$x = x_\text{static}[1 - \cos(\omega t)]$$

This gives the (theoretical) time history of the structure due to a load F(t), where the false assumption is made that there is no damping.

Although this is too simplistic to apply to a real structure, the Heaviside step function is a reasonable model for the application of many real loads, such as the sudden addition of a piece of furniture, or the removal of a prop to a newly cast concrete floor. However, in reality loads are never applied instantaneously – they build up over a period of time (this may be very short indeed). This time is called the rise time.

As the number of degrees of freedom of a structure increases it very quickly becomes too difficult to calculate the time history manually – real structures are analysed using non-linear finite element analysis software.

== Damping ==
Any real structure will dissipate energy (mainly through friction). This can be modelled by modifying the DAF

$$\text{DAF} = 1 + e^{-c\pi}$$

where $c=\frac{\text {damping coefficient}}{\text{critical damping coefficient}}$ and is typically 2–10% depending on the type of construction:

- Bolted steel ~6%
- Reinforced concrete ~5%
- Welded steel ~2%
- Brick masonry ~10%

Methods to increase damping

One of the widely used methods to increase damping is to attach a layer of material with a high Damping Coefficient, for example rubber, to a vibrating structure.

== Modal analysis ==
A modal analysis calculates the frequency modes or natural frequencies of a given system, but not necessarily its full-time history response to a given input. The natural frequency of a system is dependent only on the stiffness of the structure and the mass which participates with the structure (including self-weight). It is not dependent on the load function.

It is useful to know the modal frequencies of a structure as it allows you to ensure that the frequency of any applied periodic loading will not coincide with a modal frequency and hence cause resonance, which leads to large oscillations.

The method is:

1. Find the natural modes (the shape adopted by a structure) and natural frequencies
2. Calculate the response of each mode
3. Optionally superpose the response of each mode to find the full modal response to a given loading

=== Energy method ===
It is possible to calculate the frequency of different mode shape of system manually by the energy method. For a given mode shape of a multiple degree of freedom system you can find an "equivalent" mass, stiffness and applied force for a single degree of freedom system. For simple structures the basic mode shapes can be found by inspection, but it is not a conservative method. Rayleigh's principle states:

"The frequency ω of an arbitrary mode of vibration, calculated by the energy method, is always greater than – or equal to – the fundamental frequency ω_{n}."

For an assumed mode shape $\bar{u}(x)$, of a structural system with mass M; bending stiffness, EI (Young's modulus, E, multiplied by the second moment of area, I); and applied force, F(x):

$$\text{Equivalent mass, } M_\text{eq} = \int M \bar{u}^2 \, du$$

$$\text{Equivalent stiffness, } k_\text{eq} = \int EI \left(\frac{d^2\bar{u}}{dx^2} \right)^2 \, dx$$

$$\text{Equivalent force, } F_\text{eq} = \int F\bar{u} \, dx$$

then, as above:

$$\omega = \sqrt{\frac{k_\text{eq}}{M_\text{eq}}}$$

=== Modal response ===
The complete modal response to a given load F(x,t) is $v(x,t)=\sum u_n(x,t)$. The summation can be carried out by one of three common methods:

- Superpose complete time histories of each mode (time consuming, but exact)
- Superpose the maximum amplitudes of each mode (quick but conservative)
- Superpose the square root of the sum of squares (good estimate for well-separated frequencies, but unsafe for closely spaced frequencies)

To superpose the individual modal responses manually, having calculated them by the energy method:

Assuming that the rise time t_{r} is known (T = 2π/ω), it is possible to read the DAF from a standard graph. The static displacement can be calculated with $u_\text{static}=\frac{F_{1,\text{eq}}}{k_{1,\text{eq}}}$. The dynamic displacement for the chosen mode and applied force can then be found from:

$$u_{\max} = u_\text{static} \text{DAF}$$

== Modal participation factor ==
For real systems there is often mass participating in the forcing function (such as the mass of ground in an earthquake) and mass participating in inertia effects (the mass of the structure itself, M_{eq}). The modal participation factor Γ is a comparison of these two masses. For a single degree of freedom system Γ = 1.

$$\Gamma = \frac{\sum M_n\bar{u}_n }{\sum M_n\bar{u}_n^2 }$$
