= Plant Simulation =

Tecnomatix Plant Simulation
- Developer(s): Siemens Digital Industries Software
- Stable release: Tecnomatix Plant Simulation 2302 / 2023
- Operating system: Windows 10&11 32 bit + 64 bit /Windows XP/Vista
- Available in: English, German, Chinese
- Type: Discrete event simulation
- License: Commercial
- Website: Plant Simulation

Plant Simulation is a computer application developed by Siemens Digital Industries Software for modelling, simulating, analyzing, visualizing and optimizing production systems and processes, the flow of materials and logistic operations. Plant Simulation, allows users to optimize material flow and resource utilization and logistics for all levels of plant planning from global production facilities, through local plants, to specific lines. Within the Plant Design and Optimization Solution, the software portfolio, to which Plant Simulation belongs, is — together with the products of the Digital Factory and of Digital Manufacturing — part of the Product Lifecycle Management Software (PLM). The application allows comparing complex production alternatives, including the immanent process logic, by means of computer simulations. Plant Simulation is used by individual production planners as well as by multi-national enterprises, primarily to strategically plan layout, and control logic and dimensions of large, complex production investments. It is one of the major products that dominate that market space.

== Description ==
Plant Simulation is a Material flow simulation Software (Discrete Event Simulation; DES Software). Using simulation, complex and dynamic enterprise workflows are evaluated to arrive at mathematically safeguarded entrepreneurial decisions. The Computer model allows the user to execute experiments and run through 'what if scenarios' without either having to experiment with the real production environment or when applied within the planning phase, long before the real system exists. In general, the Material flow analysis is used when discrete production processes are running. These processes are characterized by non-steady material flows, which means that the part is either there or not there, the shift takes place or does not take place, and the machine works without errors or reports a failure. These processes resist simple mathematical descriptions and derivations due to numerous dependencies. Before powerful computers were available, most problems of material flow simulation were solved by means of queuing theory and operations research methods. In most cases, the solutions resulting from these calculations were hard to understand and were marked by a large number of boundary conditions and restrictions that were hard to abide by in reality.

=== Languages ===
Plant Simulation is available in English, German, Japanese, Hungarian, Russian and Chinese. The user can create individual Dialog boxes using double-byte characters and offering individual parameterizations. The user can switch between the available languages.

=== Special features ===
- Object-oriented programming with
  - Inheritance: Users create libraries with their own objects, which can be re-used. As opposed to a copy, any change to an object class within the library is propagated to any of the derived objects (children).
  - Polymorphism: Classes can be derived and derived methods can be redefined. This enables users to build complex models faster, easier and with a clearer structure.
  - Hierarchy: Complex structures can be created very clearly on several (logic) layers. This facilitates a Top-down and bottom-up design approach.
- Openness for importing data from other systems, such as Access or Oracle data bases, Excel worksheets or from SAP.
- Integration: Plant Simulation is part of the Digital factory and supports
  - importing data from PLM systems or be used during
  - Virtual Commissioning
  - taking over layout data from AutoCAD, Microstation, Factory CAD, etc. directly into the simulation.
- Provides comprehensible analysis tools for detecting bottlenecks (Bottleneck Analyzer), for tracking the flow of materials (Sankey diagrams) or for detecting over-dimensioned resources (Chart Wizard).
- Provides integrated optimization tools:
  - The Experiment Manager automatically creates scenarios or evaluates dependencies between two input parameters.
  - Genetic algorithms search large solution spaces.
  - Neural networks show the connection between input and output parameters and can be used for forecasting.
- Data analysis: Detection of dependencies, Regression analysis, best fitting function etc.

== Scope of application ==
=== Calculation of enterprise characteristics ===
Goal:

- Detect and show problems which might otherwise cause costs and time-intensive correction measures during the ramp-up phase.
- Offer mathematically calculated key performance indicators (KPI) instead of expert's "gut feelings."
- Reduce investment costs for production lines without endangering the required output quantities.
- Optimize the performance of existing production lines.
- Incorporate machine failures and availabilities (MTTR, MTBF) when calculating throughput numbers and utilization.

=== Visualization ===
Plant Simulation can be used to display production both in 2D and 3D. The 3D display is especially helpful as a sales tool or for in-house communication of planned measures. In addition it allows to present the entire system concept within a virtual, interactive, immersive environment to non-simulation experts. The 3D engine is based on the industry standard JT format. CAD applications such as NX, Solid Edge can export models in this format. The 3D data files can be imported in the JT format '.jt' by using Drag-and-drop.

== Used in ==
Plant Simulation is used in most industries, most noticeably:

- Automotive industry Automotive Industry Workgroup Material Flow Simulation
- Automotive suppliers
- Aerospace
- Plant manufacturing
- Mechanical engineering
- Process industry
- Electronics industry
- Consumer packaged goods industry
- Airports
- Logistics companies (transport logistics, storage logistics and production logistics)
- High bay warehouse suppliers, suppliers of automated guided vehicle systems and electric overhead monorail systems
- Consulting houses and service providers
- Shipyards Simulation Cooperation in the Maritime Industries; SimCoMar is an interest group of shipyards and suppliers, universities and institutions engaged in the simulation of shipbuilding
- Harbors, especially container terminals
- Research and development purposes at universities and universities of applied science

== Application history ==
Year	Company	Product name
1986	The Fraunhofer Institute for Manufacturing Engineering and Automation develops an object-oriented, hierarchical simulation program for the Apple Macintosh	SIMPLE Mac for Apple Macintosh
1990	AIS (Angewande Informations Systeme, Stuttgart) founded	SIMPLE++ (Simulation in Produktion Logistik and Engineering)
1991	AIS renamed to AESOP (Angewande EDV-Systeme zur optimierten Planung)	SIMPLE++ (Simulation in Produktion Logistik und Engineering)
1997	AESOP acquired by Tecnomatix Ltd.	2000 SIMPLE++ renamed to eM-Plant
2004	Tecnomatix Ltd. acquired by UGS Corporation	2005 eM-Plant renamed to Tecnomatix Plant Simulation
2007	UGS Corporation acquired by Siemens AG	Tecnomatix Plant Simulation
