= List of Siemens products =

Products produced by Siemens

== Manufacturing IT ==
- Teamcenter from UGS acquisition
- Siemens PLM NX 3D CAD/CAM/CAE
- Siemens PLM Solid Edge 3D CAD
- Siemens PLM Teamcenter cPDM
- Siemens PLM Tecnomatix Digital Manufacturing
- Opcenter
- SIMATIC IT
- CAMSTAR
- Opcenter APS (formerly known as Preactor)
- IBS
- SIMATIC PCS 7 Process Automation System for Process and Hybrid industries
- Industrial programmable controls (including Simatic PLC, and Logo! microcontrollers)
- COMOS
- Simcenter STAR-CCM+

== Industrial ==
- BRAUMAT Process Control System
- Industrial Instrumentation (Sensors and communication)
- SIRIUS Controls
- SINAMICS & Perfect Harmony drives
- SinaSave Energy efficiency and amortization calculation
- Electric motors
- SIMATIC Controller
- SIMATIC Human Machine Interface (HMI)
- SIMATIC PCS 7 Distributed Control System (DCS)
- SINUMERIK Computerized Numerical Control (CNC)
- SIMATIC Automation Designer
- SIMATIC WinCC

== PCs ==
- 1990-1999: Siemens Nixdorf
- 1999-2009: Fujitsu Siemens Computers - completely divested to Fujitsu

== Telecommunications ==
- OpenScape Voice (HiPath 8000)
- OpenScape Contact Center (formerly HiPath ProCenter)
- OpenStage IP and TDM phones
- Telecommunication Service Platform, the TSP 7000
- Hicom Trading E
- Hicom 300
- HiPath
- HiQ 8000 Softswitch
- HiE 9200 Softswitch
- MSR32R
- EWSD telephone exchanges
- SPX 2000 small digital telephone exchange (rural)
- Siemens Gigaset cordless telephones (19% share, Gigaset was sold to Arques Industries)
- Siemens Mobile Phones – divested to BenQ in 2005
- Radio and core products for 2G and 3G Mobile Networks (GSM, UMTS, ...)

== Transportation/Rail ==
(See also Siemens Mobility)

- Combino, ULF, and Avanto trams
- Siemens-Duewag U2 LRV – Edmonton Transit System and Calgary Transit – Alberta, Canada
- Siemens SD-160 – Edmonton Transit System and Calgary Transit – Alberta, Canada
- LHB/Siemens M1/M2/M3 Metro (Pair) – Prague Metro Czech Republic
- Siemens-Adtranz LRV
- MX3000 Metro car for Oslo (SGP Wien works) – Oslo T-bane, Norway
- CAF S4000 Metro – Barcelona Metro
- Schindler/Fiat-SIG/Adtranz Cobra Be 4/6 Low Floor LRV – Zurich VBZ
- Class H Metro 5001 – Berlin BVG
- SWBSiemensr NGT 6D LRV – Bonn, Germany
- Eurorunner diesel locomotive
- EuroSprinter electric locomotive
- C651, Mass Rapid Transit (Singapore)
- Siemens Desiro regional train
- ICE and related Velaro, and future ICx intercity trains.
- Transrapid maglev.
- Siemens Modular Metro: Siemens Nexas, Melbourne, Australia
- EMU321, EMU341 – TRTC, Taipei
- VL256 (original from MATRA) – TRTC, Taipei
- Kaohsiung Mass Rapid Transit System KMRT
- Viaggio and Viaggio Light (for Israel Railways)
- Siemens Vectron electric locomotives
- Ankara Metro Ankaray Light Metro M1 and M2 cars - with AnsaldoBreda and Adtranz
- Siemens-Duewag SD-400 LRV - Port Authority Transit of Allegheny County, Pittsburgh, Pennsylvania
- Siemens Charger - series of diesel-powered passenger locomotives built for the North American market

== Control Systems ==
- SiMotion
- Siemens SPPA-T2000 Control System (formerly Teleperm XP)
- Siemens SPPA-T3000 Control System (For Electrical Power Generation Control)
- Siemens PCS7 (process control system) for Process Industries and Oil & Gas
- SiPass Security
- SiVeillance Command & Control
- SPC Intrusion systems

== Healthcare ==
=== Computed Tomography ===
- SOMATOM(R) go.Up
- SOMATOM(R) go.Now
- SOMATOM(R) Force CT
- SOMATOM(R) Definition Flash CT
- SOMATOM(R) Definition Edge CT
- SOMATOM(R) Definition AS CT
- SOMATOM(R) Definition CT
- SOMATOM(R) Sensation CT
- SOMATOM(R) Emotion CT
- SOMATOM(R) Balance CT
- SOMATOM(R) Spirit CT
- SOMATOM(R) Perspective CT
- SOMATOM (R) Scope CT
- SOMATOM (R) Volume Zoom CT
- SOMATOM (R) Go Top CT
- NAEOTOM (R) Alpha

=== Magnetic Resonance ===
- Magnetom C!, a low field open MRI
- Managed Equipment Services(.35T)
- Magnetom C!, a low field open MRI (.35T)
- Magnetom Aera 1.5T
- Magnetom Avanto, a Tim system MRI (1.5T)
- MAGNETOM Essenza, a Tim system MRI (1.5T)
- Magnetom Espree, a Tim system, open bore MRI (1.5T)
- Magnetom Espree Pink, a Tim system, breast dedicated open bore MRI (1.5T)
- Magnetom Sola (1.5T)
- Magnetom Altea (1.5T)
- Magnetom Amira (1.5T)
- Magnetom Sempra (1.5T)
- Magnetom Spectra 3T
- Magnetom Skyra 3T
- Magnetom Trio, A Tim System, ultra high field MRI (3.0T)
- Magnetom Verio, A Tim System, ultra high field MRI (3.0T)
- Magnetom Lumina (3T)
- Magnetom Prisma (3T)
- Magnetom Vida (3T)
- Magnetom Terra (7T)

=== Mammography ===
- Mammomat Inspiration
- Mammomat Novation
- Mammomat Fusion
- Mammomat Revelation

=== Molecular Imaging ===
- Biograph TruePoint PET.CT
- Biograph mMR PET.MR
- Symbia TruePoint SPECT-CT. Biograph MCt pet-ct

=== Radiation Oncology ===
- ARTISTE Linear Accelerator
- ONCOR Linear Accelerator
- Primus Linear Accelerator
- KD2 Linear Accelerator
- MD2 Linear Accelerator
- Mevatron Linear Accelerator

=== Software ===
- DocuLive, EPR
- Dynamics, Multi-modality image review, reporting, and PACS
- Siemens Soarian HIS
- MagicStore
- MagicView 1000
- MagicView 300
- Syngo Carbon
- syngo Imaging XS
- syngo.plaza
- syngo WebSpace
- syngo.via
- syngo classic
- syngo Dynamics
- syngo Imaging
- syngo Workflow
- syngo teamplay
- syngo.share
- syngo Virtual Cockpit

=== Ultrasound ===
- Acuson Antares Ultrasound
- Acuson Cypress Ultrasound
- Acuson S2000 Ultrasound
- Acuson S3000 Ultrasound
- Acuson SC2000 Ultrasound
- sonoline adara
- sonoline g20
- sonoline g40
- sonoline g50
- sonoline g60
- acuson x150
- acuson x300
- acuson x300 pe
- acuson x500

=== X-Ray ===
Radiography, Angiography, Fluoroscopy etc.

- AXIOM Aristos
- AXIOM Artis
- AXIOM Iconos
- AXIOM Luminos dRF
- AXIOM Multix
- AXIOM Sensis
- Ysio
- multimobile 2.5
- multimobile 10
- multimobile 5c
- multimobile 5e
- multimobile 5d
- multiphos 10
- multiphos 15

=== Other ===
- E.Cam Signature Series Gamma Camera
- Mobilett
- Advia(R) hematology systems
- The Siemens Servo ventilator
- Hemastasis
- Immunology
- eHealth Solutions

== Energy ==
=== Power Generation ===
- Renewables:
  - Siemens Wind Power (previously Bonus Energy in Brande, Denmark) : Windturbines, 2.3 MW, gearless (direct drive) 3.0 MW, 3.6 MW, 6.0 MW; onshore and offshore

=== Power Transmission ===
- Transformers
- HVDC
- Disconnector
- Power Capacitor
- Instrument Transformer
- SIESTORAGE Energy storage

=== Grid Control ===
- Spectrum Power 5 (formerly known as Spectrum PowerCC)
- Spectrum Power 7 (merger of Spectrum Power 3 and Spectrum Power 4)
- Gridscale X LV Insights

== Infrastructure ==
=== Low and Medium Voltage ===
- SENTRON low voltage switchgear, monitoring
- SIVACON power distribution boards
- ALPHA distribution boards
- DELTA switches and sockets
- GAMMA Building Control

=== Building Automation ===
- DESIGO Building Automation
- APOGEE Building Automation (PPCL Program)
- Synco Living
- XLS Firefinder
- WinCIS

== Fire Safety ==
- CerberusPRO Fire detection system
- SINTESO Fire detection system
- Sinorix

== Other ==
- @ctiveFRIEND
