= Red Cedar Technology =

Engineering consultancy

Red Cedar Technology, Inc.
- Type: Private
- Industry: Design Optimization, CAE Software, and Engineering Services
- Founded: East Lansing, Michigan, USA (1999)
- Headquarters: East Lansing, Michigan, USA
- Key people: Bob Ryan, Ph.D. (President)
- Products: HEEDS MDO; HEEDS NP; HEEDS POST
- Services: Engineering Consulting
- Website: www.redcedartech.com

Red Cedar Technology is a software development and engineering services company. Red Cedar Technology was founded by Michigan State University professors Ron Averill and Erik Goodman in 1999. The headquarters is located in East Lansing, Michigan, near MSU's campus. Red Cedar Technology develops and distributes the HEEDS Professional suite of design optimization software. HEEDS is based on spin-out technology from Michigan State University. On June 30, 2013 Red Cedar Technology was acquired by CD-adapco. CD-adapco was acquired in 2016 by Siemens Digital Industries Software.

== History ==
Red Cedar Technology was founded in 1999 to commercialize technology developed at Michigan State University. The company initially provided engineering consulting services including non-linear FEA and design optimization. The optimization technology was released as a software product, HEEDS, in 2004.

== HEEDS MDO ==
HEEDS (Hierarchical Evolutionary Engineering Design System) MDO is a software package that interfaces with commercial CAE tools in order to automate and improve the search for better product and/or process designs. HEEDS can perform both single-objective and multi-objective (Pareto) optimization. Additionally, HEEDS includes the ability to perform Design of Experiments and Reliability analysis. HEEDS MDO was formerly named HEEDS Professional.

HEEDS is utilized across many industries, including Aerospace, Automotive, Biomedical, and Manufacturing. Products such as Nitinol stents, crash rails in automobiles, MEMS and fiber composite parts have all been designed using HEEDS.

HEEDS generically interfaces with analysis codes through batch execution and different forms of scripting, but also includes direct interfaces to several commonly used CAE tools, including Abaqus, ANSYS, LS-DYNA, Nastran, NX, STAR-CCM+ and Microsoft Excel.

=== Design Optimization ===
When an engineer is required to design a component or system to conflicting performance criteria, design optimization is often used. HEEDS allows the user to analyze a design based on their normal CAE tools, and explore different options that exist based on user-defined design variables. HEEDS includes the SHERPA algorithm, which is an intelligent, hybrid, adaptive design optimization method. SHERPA is based on over two decades of research at Michigan State University, and was spun off to Red Cedar Technology in 1999.

HEEDS also has the MO-SHERPA algorithm, which is an adapted version of the SHERPA algorithm designed for multi-objective design optimization. This gives the user the opportunity to find a set of Pareto optimal designs, and gain information regarding the trade offs between the objectives.

The following design optimization algorithms are available in HEEDS:

- SHERPA
- Multi-objective SHERPA (MO-SHERPA)
- Genetic algorithm
- Sequential quadratic programming
- Simulated annealing
- Response surface methodology
- Multi-start local search
- Particle swarm optimization
- Nelder-Mead Simplex

=== Design of Experiments (DOE) ===
HEEDS allows the user to predict sensitivities using Design of Experiments. The following sampling methods are available:

- Full factorial designs (2-level and 3-level)
- Fractional factorial designs (2-level and 3-level)
- Taguchi orthogonal arrays
- Plackett-Burman designs
- Latin hypercube designs
- Central composite designs
- D-optimal designs
- Taguchi robust design arrays
- User-defined arrays
- User-defined response data

=== Robustness and Reliability ===
HEEDS has a Robustness and Reliability agent which allows the user to perform robustness studies using Monte Carlo Sampling or Latin hypercube sampling and reliability studies using Monte Carlo Sampling, Latin hypercube sampling, or FORM. Robustness studies can tell the user how sensitive the design is to stochastic variation of the input parameters. Reliability studies can tell the user how likely a design is to violate constraint limits as a result of stochastic variation of the input parameters.

== HEEDS NP ==
HEEDS NP is a non-parametric, mesh-based optimization tool that is used to design structural components. The mesh of the component is morphed directly by the software to meet mass or stress targets.

== HEEDS POST ==
View exported from HEEDS POST v1.0 showing a design table, response surface fit plot, and 3D MARS surface plot from a DOE study.

HEEDS POST is a post-processing and data visualization suite designed to work with HEEDS MDO results files.

== Red Cedar University ==
Red Cedar University is a service provided by Red Cedar Technology to educate those interested in design optimization.
