= Assembly modelling =

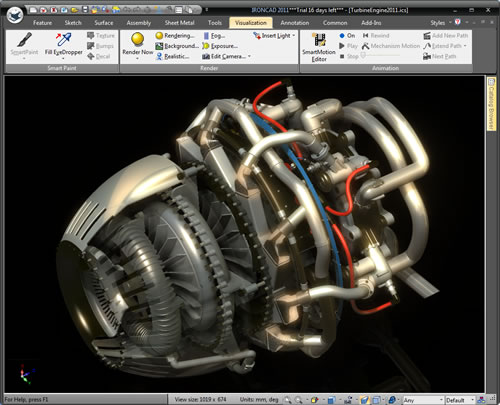
An assembly

Assembly modeling is a technology and method used by computer-aided design and product visualization computer software systems to handle multiple files that represent components within a product. The components within an assembly are represented as solid or surface models.

== Overview ==
The designer generally has access to models that others are working on concurrently. For example, several people may be designing one machine that has many parts. New parts are added to an assembly model as they are created. Each designer has access to the assembly model, while a work in progress, and while working in their own parts. The design evolution is visible to everyone involved. Depending on the system, it might be necessary for the users to acquire the latest versions saved of each individual components to update the assembly.

The individual data files describing the 3D geometry of individual components are assembled together through a number of sub-assembly levels to create an assembly describing the whole product. All CAD and CPD systems support this form of bottom-up construction. Some systems, via associative copying of geometry between components also allow top-down method of design.

Components can be positioned within the product assembly using absolute coordinate placement methods or by means of mating conditions. Mating conditions are definitions of the relative position of components between each other; for example alignment of axis of two holes or distance of two faces from one another. The final position of all components based on these relationships is calculated using a geometry constraint engine built into the CAD or visualization package.

The importance of assembly modeling in achieving the full benefits of PLM has led to ongoing advances in this technology. These include the use of lightweight data structures such as JT that allow visualization of and interaction with large amounts of product data, direct interface to between Digital Mock ups and PDM systems and active digital mock up technology that unites the ability to visualize the assembly mock up with the ability to measure, analyze, simulate, design and redesign.

== See also ==
- System testing (e2e : components testing as a whole)
