= Industry IoT Consortium =

Trade organization

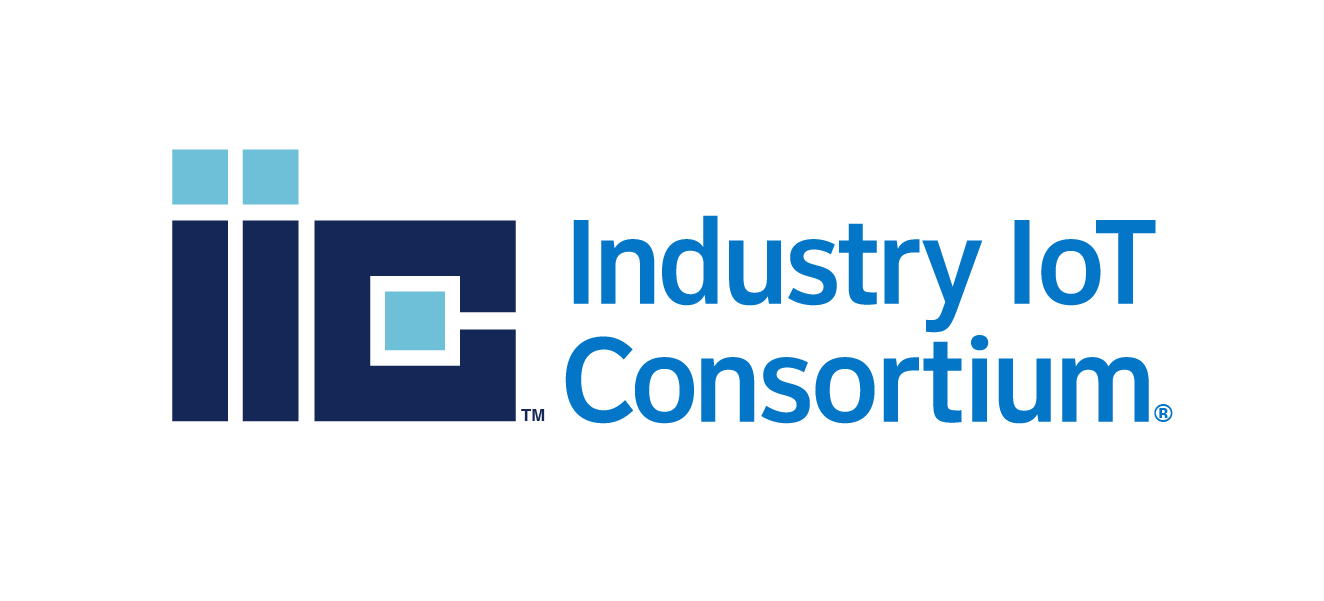
- Abbreviation: IIC
- Formation: 2014
- Type: Technology
- Headquarters: Boston, Massachusetts
- Region served: Global
- Members: 159 member organizations
- Parent organization: Object Management Group
- Website: www.iiconsortium.org

The Industry IoT Consortium (IIC) (previously the Industrial Internet Consortium) is an open-member organization and a program of the Object Management Group (OMG). Founded by AT&T, Cisco, General Electric, IBM, and Intel in March 2014, with the stated goal "to deliver transformative business value to industry, organizations, and society by accelerating the adoption of a trustworthy internet of things".

As of February 12, 2024, the IIC contains 224 member organizations. The current executive director of the IIC is William Hoffman, and the current chief technical officer is Chuck Byers.

== History ==
The Industry IoT Consortium (IIC) was founded on March 27, 2014 by AT&T, Cisco, General Electric, IBM, and Intel. Though its parent company is the Object Management Group, the IIC is not a standards organization. Rather, the consortium was formed with the stated goal to bring together industry professionals to promote the development and adoption of Industrial Internet technologies.

Specifically, IIC members are concerned with "delivering transformative business value to industry, organizations, and society by accelerating the adoption of a trustworthy internet of things". The IIC Technology Working Group ratified an Industrial Internet reference architecture on June 17, 2015, which defines functional areas, technologies, and standards for IIC members, including sensors, data analytics, and business applications.

== Testbeds ==
The development of testbeds to demonstrate the real-world implementation of Industrial Internet solutions is one of the goals of the IIC. As of February 2024, the Consortium has publicly announced 27 testbeds.

=== Track and Trace ===
The goal of the Track and Trace testbed is to manage handheld power tools in manufacturing and maintenance environments. This "management" involves efficiently tracking and tracing the usage of these tools to ensure their proper use, prevent their misuse and collect data on their usage and status.

The tools in Track and Trace determine their own precise location and use it, therefore, will be able to determine the force and work needed to complete an exacting task. In addition, if a tool recognizes that it is being misused, it will promptly power down to avoid accident or injury. Over the two-year project, the testbed participants fine-tuned localization of tools to 30 centimeters, with the goal to get accuracy down to five centimeters at some point in the future. Near the start of the project, the accuracy was approximately one meter. These features of Track and Trace have been created with the goal of contributing to the safety and quality of the goods produced, as well as increasing productivity in manufacturing.

Over the two-year project, four Industrial Internet Consortium members lent their expertise to the testbed. Bosch supplied the necessary software; Cisco took care of the precision location identification feature; National Instruments interconnected the power tools; and Tech Mahindra was responsible for the application programming.

=== Asset Efficiency Testbed ===
Many industries have assets that are critical to their business processes. Availability and efficiency of these assets directly impact service and business. Using predictive analytics, the Asset Efficiency Testbed aims to collect real-time asset information efficiently and accurately and run analytics to make the right decisions in terms of operations, maintenance, overhaul and asset replacement. Infosys, a member of the Industrial Internet Consortium, is leading this project, with contribution from Consortium members Bosch, General Electric, IBM, Intel, National Instruments, and PTC.

Asset Efficiency is a vertical testbed, making it possible for the testbed to be applied to multiple solutions. The testbed will launch in two phases. In the first phase, the testbed will be created for a moving solution, in this case, aircraft landing gear. The focus of this phase will be on the creation of stack and the integration of technologies. In the second phase, the testbed will address fixed assets, like chillers, with the goals of finalizing the architecture and opening up the interfaces.

The Asset Efficiency Testbed monitors, controls and optimizes the assets holistically taking into consideration operational, energy, maintenance, service, and information efficiency and enhance their performance utilization.

=== Edge Intelligence Testbed ===
Many emerging industrial IoT applications require coordinated, real-time analytics at the "edge", using algorithms that require a scale of computation and data volume/velocity previously seen only in the data center. Frequently, the networks connecting these machines do not provide sufficient capability, bandwidth, reliability, or cost structure to enable analytics-based control or coordination algorithms to run in a separate location from the machines.

Industrial Internet Consortium members Hewlett-Packard and Real-Time Innovation have joined on the Edge Intelligence Testbed. The primary objective of the Edge Intelligence Testbed is to significantly accelerate the development of edge architectures and algorithms by removing the barriers that many developers face, such as access to a wide variety of advanced compute hardware and software configurable to directly resemble state-of-the-art edge systems at very low cost to the tester/developer.

=== Factory Operations Visibility & Intelligence Testbed ===
The Factory Operations Visibility & Intelligence (FOVI) Testbed makes it possible to simulate a factory environment in order to visualize results that can then be used to determine how the process can be optimized. The work on FOVI stems from two separate Operations Visibility and Intelligence applications in two factories in Japan: one for notebook computers and another for network appliances. Both use cases have a lot in common with respect to processing data, analytics, and visualization technologies. Ideally they should use a common software foundation while their future evolution requires a more open architecture.

Work on the testbed will be led by Industrial Internet Consortium member Fujitsu Limited with Industrial Internet Consortium founding member, Cisco, collaborating on the in-factory testbed edge infrastructure.

=== High Speed Network Infrastructure Testbed ===
The High-Speed Network Infrastructure testbed will introduce high-speed fiber optic lines to support Industrial Internet initiatives. The network will transfer data at 100 gigabits per second to support seamless machine-2-machines communications and data transfer across connected control systems, big infrastructure products, and manufacturing plants.

The 100 gigabit capability extends to the wireless edge, allowing the testbed leaders to provide more data and analytical results to mobile users through advanced communication techniques. Industrial Internet Consortium founder, General Electric, is leading efforts by installing the networking lines at its Global Research Center. Cisco - also a founder of the Consortium - contributed its expertise to the project by providing the infrastructure needed to give the network its national reach. Industrial Internet Consortium members Accenture and Bayshore Networks are currently demonstrating the application of the High-Speed Network Infrastructure for power generation.

=== Industrial Digital Thread Testbed ===
The Industrial Digital Thread (IDT) testbed enhances efficiency, speed, and flexibility by digitization and automation manufacturing processes. Beginning at the design stage, digital integration connects design systems with manufacturing, enabling model-based enterprise practices and allowing virtual manufacturing before any physical part is produced. Sensor-enabled automation and machine data support optimization across operations and supply chains. Once production is complete, the digital “birth certificate” (as-built signature) can be compared with the original engineering design. This comparison provides a foundation for advanced data analytics, giving service teams and field engineers clearer insights and actionable information to improve the maintenance and performance of critical assets.

The Industrial Digital Thread is a complex and comprehensive concept and it will be implemented in multiple phases. Phase 1 focuses on assembling the software stack, establishing the architecture and connectivity, and addressing one use case around premature wear. Throughout Phase 1, the testbed will be run by IIC members General Electric and Infosys. In subsequent phases, this testbed will be able to support multiple use cases in design, manufacturing, services and supply-chain optimization. At this time, additional members will be invited to join.

=== INFINITE Testbed ===
The goal of the International Future Industrial Internet Testbed (INFINITE) is to develop software-defined infrastructures to drive the growth of Industrial Internet products and services. INFINITE uses Big Data to not only create completely virtual domains with Software-Defined Networking, but it also makes it possible for multiple virtual domains to securely run via one physical network - thus making it ideal for use in mission critical systems. Even more interesting, INFINITE makes it possible to connect to these virtual domains through mobile networks.

Industrial Internet Consortium member, EMC Corporation, is leading the INFINITE testbed. Also contributing their expertise to this project is Industrial Internet Consortium member Cork Institute of Technology, as well as Vodafone, the Irish Government Networks, Asavie and Cork Internet Exchange.

The testbed will unfold in two phases in Ireland. In Phase One, three geographically dispersed data centers will be interconnected into a reconfigured EMC network. In Phase Two, INFINITE will be applied to a use case called "Bluelight". Bluelight will allow ambulances to securely connect to a hospital's system and relay information while en route, so hospital staff are prepared to take over the care of the patient once the ambulance arrives.

The INFINITE testbed is open to any Industrial Internet Consortium member as well as interested nonmembers companies who have a concept for an IoT-enabled solution that requires mobile communication and a dynamic configuration environment.

=== Condition Monitoring and Predictive Maintenance Testbed ===
The Condition Monitoring and Predictive Maintenance Testbed (CM/PM) will demonstrate the value and benefits of continuously monitoring industrial equipment to detect early signs of performance degradation or failure. CM/PM will also use modern analytical technologies to allow organizations to not only detect problems but proactively recommend actions for operations and maintenance personnel to correct the problem.

Condition Monitoring (CM) is the use of sensors in equipment to gather data and enable users to centrally monitor the data in real-time. Predictive Maintenance (PM) applies analytical models and rules against the data to proactively predict an impending issue; then deliver recommendations to operations, maintenance and IT departments to address the issue. These capabilities enable new ways to monitor the operation of the equipment - such as turbines and generators - and processes and to adopt proactive maintenance and repair procedures rather than fixed schedule-based procedures, potentially saving money on maintenance and repair, and saving cost and lost productivity of downtime caused by equipment failures. Furthermore, combining sensor data from multiple pieces of equipment and/or multiple processes can provide deeper insight into the overall impact of faulty or sub-optimal equipment, allowing organizations to identify and resolve problems before they impact operations and improve the quality and efficiency of industrial processes.

Through this testbed, the testbed leaders IBM and National Instruments will explore the application of a variety of analytics technologies for condition monitoring and predictive maintenance. The testbed application will initially be deployed to a power plant facility where performance and progress will be reported on, additional energy equipment will be added, and new models will be developed. It will then be expanded to adjacent, as yet to be determined, industries.

Smart Airline Baggage Management Testbed

The Smart Airline Baggage Management testbed, part of a broader aviation ecosystem vision, is aimed at reducing the instances of delayed, damaged and lost bags leading to lower economic risk exposure to the airlines; increasing the ability to track and report on baggage including location and weight changes to prevent theft and loss; and improve customer satisfaction through better communication including offering new value-added services to frequent flyers.

The testbed is also aimed at helping airlines address the new baggage handling requirements set out by IATA in Resolution 753 requiring airlines to implement more comprehensive acquisition and delivery solutions for baggage tracking and handling by June 2018. This target is also outlined in the broader IATA 2015 White Paper titled "Simplifying the Business."

== Working Groups ==
As of September 2021, the IIC has six working groups: Technology, Security, Liaison, Marketing, Industry and Digital Transformation. The last two reflect the drive to enable technology end users to deploy technology in their businesses and transform them digitally (The Industry Working Group used to be called the Testbed Working Group, but now includes test drives and challenges, and groups focused on specific verticals. The Digital Transformation Working Group used to be named Business Strategy and Solution Lifecycle, but has now broadened its remit). Each working group has a number of subgroups to further specific challenges. Each IIC member company can assign company representatives to these groups.
