= Shlomo Dovrat =

Israeli businessman

- שלמה דוברת
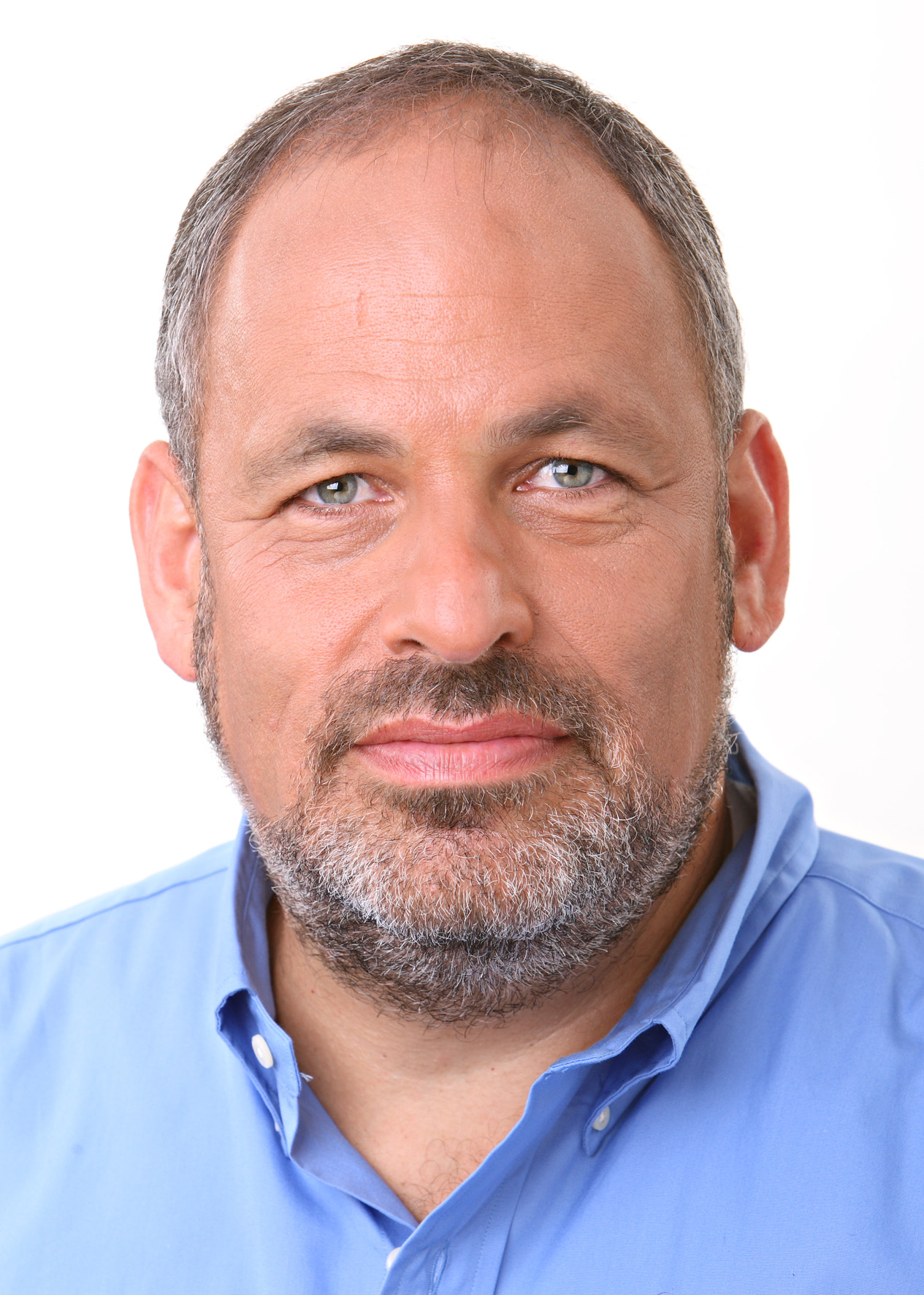
- Dovrat in 2020
- Born: July 7, 1959 66 years old
- Occupation: Venture capitalist
- Known for: High-tech entrepreneur

Shlomo Dovrat (Hebrew: שלמה דוברת) is an Israeli high-tech entrepreneur and co-founder and General Partner at Viola Ventures, a top-tier Israeli venture capital firm, with over $4.5B under management. He spearheaded the recovery of ECI Telecom and in January 2005, sold Tecnomatix to the American software company UGS Corp. for about $227.7 million, making about $10 million from the deal. He is also known for heading the Israeli national commission for reform in education, known as the Dovrat Commission.

== Career ==
Like many Israeli high tech entrepreneurs, Dovrat served in the Israel Defense Forces's Unit 8200. The first publicly traded company that Dovrat managed was Oshap, who went public on Wall Street in the mid-1980s. Dovrat managed Oshap business in Belgium, then at the age of 26 he became its CEO. In early 1999, SunGard bought Oshap for $220 million in a stock swap deal. Dovrat netted about $40 million from the sale.

Shlomo Dovrat founded Tecnomatix and served as its CEO and president from 1983 to 1995. He served as chairman until December 2001 and as a director until the company was eventually sold to UGS in 2005.

In 2000, Dovrat co-founded Viola Ventures.

Dovrat currently serves on the board of directors of a number of portfolio companies, including Outbrain, ironSource, Optimal+, Worthy, Lightricks and Cellwize.

Dovrat has also served as chairman of ECI Telecom from 2002 until the sale of the company in 2007 for $1.25 billion.

Dovrat chaired the panel that handed out the first Israel Prize for Hi-Tech.

== Dovrat Commission ==
The government-appointed Dovrat Commission, led by Dovrat, concluded in 2004, that the key to improving Israeli education is not more money but better-quality teaching. The recommendations included a reform giving school principals the right to fire bad teachers and reward good ones with higher pay. These moves have been blocked by Israel's teachers' unions, which have paralyzed schools with a series of long strikes, mostly blocking the proposed reforms.

== Philanthropy ==
Dovrat has been actively involved in numerous philanthropic and public organizations and initiatives in the areas of social and economic development. He served as the chairman of the Israel Democracy Institute, founded the Aaron Institute for Economic Policy at the Reichman University, and a co-founded Pnima – a cross community organization aspiring to create a cross tribal civic coalition.
