= RMF =

RMF is a three-letter abbreviation that may refer to:

== Computing ==
- Recover My Files, a data recovery application
- Reed–Muller canonical form
- Requirements Modeling Framework, an Eclipse Foundation project
- Resource Measurement Facility, a performance management component of the IBM z/OS Operating System
- Rich Music Format, a music file format defined by Beatnik
- Risk Management Framework, integrates information security and risk management for system development

== Military ==
- Royal Munster Fusiliers
- Royal Munster Fusiliers (New Army), New Army divisions
- Royal Munster Fusiliers (Reserves)

== Transport ==
- Marsa Alam International Airport (IATA 'RMF') International airport code
- Romford railway station, East London, United Kingdom

== Other ==
- Finnish Kalo language, ISO 639-3 code rmf
- RMF FM, Polish radio station
- Rheingau Musik Festival, an international summer music festival in Germany
- Rotating magnetic field
- Rhodes Must Fall A campaign to remove the Rhodes statue from the UCT campus.
- Ribosome modulation factor, a hibernation factor protein
