= Femap =

Engineering analysis program

Simcenter Femap
- Developer: Siemens Digital Industries Software
- Operating system: Windows 10, Windows 11
- Type: Computer Aided Engineering (CAE) software
- License: Proprietary
- Website: www.plm.automation.siemens.com/en_us/products/velocity/femap/index.shtml

Femap (Finite Element Modeling And Postprocessing) is an engineering analysis program sold by Siemens Digital Industries Software that is used to build finite element models of complex engineering problems ("pre-processing") and view solution results ("post-processing"). It runs on Microsoft Windows and provides CAD import, modeling and meshing tools to create a finite element model, as well as postprocessing functionality that allows mechanical engineers to interpret analysis results. The finite element method allows engineers to virtually model components, assemblies, or systems to determine behavior under a given set of boundary conditions, and is typically used in the design process to reduce costly prototyping and testing, evaluate differing designs and materials, and for structural optimization to reduce weight.

Product simulation applications include basic strength analysis, frequency and transient dynamic simulation, system-level performance evaluation and advanced response, fluid flow and multi-physics engineering analysis for simulation of functional performance.

Femap is used by engineering organizations and consultants to model complex products, systems and processes including satellites, aircraft, defense electronics, heavy construction equipment, lift cranes, marine vessels and process equipment.

== History ==
1985 - ESP founded by George Rudy and Femap originally developed as a pre- and postprocessor to Nastran.
1999 - ESP acquired by SDRC
2001 - SDRC acquired by EDS
2004 - Product Lifecycle Management (PLM) software suite spun off to form UGS
2007 - UGS acquired by the Automation & Drives Division of Siemens and Siemens Digital Industries Software formed

Femap product development continues as a CAD neutral and solver independent application. Also it is available bundled with a number of Siemens PLM solvers, including NX Nastran, Advanced Non-Linear Solver, Thermal/Advanced Thermal Solver, and Flow Solver. As a standalone utility Femap is typically used with independent solvers such as ADINA, NEi Nastran, LS-DYNA, ANSYS or Abaqus.

== Release history ==
Version	Release date
9.0	January 2005
9.1	November 2005
9.2	June 2006
9.3	June 2007
10	December 2008
10.1	August 2009
10.2	October 2010
10.3	September 2011
11.0	January 2013
11.1	November 2013
11.2	March 2015
11.3	May 2016
11.4	June 2017
12	October 2018
2019.1	May 2019
2020.1	January 2020
2020.2	June 2020
2021.1	January 2021
2021.2	June 2021
2022.1	January 2022
2022.2	May 2022
2301	January 2023
2306	June 2023
2401	January 2024
2406	June 2024

== Application ==
Femap is used in a number of industries, including aerospace and marine.
