= Hicom =

Hicom, HiCom or HICOM may refer to:

- Hicom (telecommunication), a PBX/ISDN telephone system family, including the Hicom 300, by Siemens
- HICOM (holding company) (Heavy Industries Corporation of Malaysia) aka HICOM Holding Berhad
- HiCom TRIAC, a high commutation TRIAC
- HICOM Automotive Manufacturers (Malaysia)
- DRB-HICOM, a Malaysian company after the merger of DRB and HICOM

== See also ==
- High Com, an analogue noise reduction system by Telefunken and Nakamichi
- UNSC High Command (HIGHCOM), a fictional UN Space Command in 'Factions of Halo'
