= MBE =

MBE may refer to:

== Academic qualifications ==
- Master of Bioprocess Engineering
- Master of Bioethics
- Master of Bioscience Enterprise
- Master of Business Engineering
- Master of Business Economics

== Science and technology ==
- The Mid-Brunhes Event, a climatic change at around 430,000 years ago
- Mode-based Execution Control, an x86 virtualization technology
- Model-based enterprise, a manufacturing strategy where a 3D model of a product is used to guide its life cycle
- Molecular-beam epitaxy, a thin-film crystal growth technique
- Molecular Biology and Evolution, a journal
- Multi-band excitation, a series of speech coding standards
- Multibeam echosounder, a device used to map ocean floors

== British honours ==
- Member of the Most Excellent Order of the British Empire

== Other uses ==
- Mail Boxes Etc., a global chain of retail business service centers
- Management by exception, a style of business management
- Minority business enterprise, a classification of business
- Morning Becomes Eclectic, a radio program
- Multistate Bar Examination, an exam administered to most prospective American lawyers
- Monbetsu Airport, an IATA code

== See also ==
- Mbe (disambiguation)
