= Scooby-Doo! Mystery of the Fun Park Phantom =

1999 video game

Scooby Doo! Mystery of the Fun Park Phantom
- Developer: Engineering Animation, Inc.
- Publishers: NA: SouthPeak Interactive; EU: Ubi Soft
- Designer: Rick Raymer
- Engine: Proprietary
- Platform: Microsoft Windows
- Release: NA: October 29, 1999; EU: 2000
- Genre: Mystery/Puzzle
- Modes: Single player, multiplayer

Scooby Doo! Mystery of the Fun Park Phantom is a 1999 mystery computer game developed by Engineering Animation, Inc. (EAI) and published by SouthPeak Interactive. The game was released for Microsoft Windows and was the first commercial Scooby-Doo game for the Windows operating system. It is intended for young children up to young teens.

== Gameplay ==
The player or players can take on the role of any of the members of the Mystery Inc. gang, except for Scooby-Doo himself. Scooby instead helps each member of the gang from time to time. Players wander the park looking for clues that might pinpoint who the culprit is. The park is divided into nine sections, each with a different theme or main attraction, such as a Ferris wheel or a roller coaster. Each player may explore a different area or the same one. Some areas also contain neighbors and employees wandering in the deserted park, all of whom have motives for wanting the park closed. For example, the banker wants to build a shopping mall on the park site and the neighboring farmer wants to expand his farmland.

In addition to finding clues, the players can acquire trap pieces to help in finally trapping the suspect. There are two types of trap pieces: rare and common. There is only one instance of rare trap pieces in the park; common pieces are located in several places. Each trap requires one rare piece and two common pieces. Each trap is tailored for one of the nine areas. Also scattered about the park are a number of Scooby Snacks. Using these, the player can coax Scooby into helping them by baiting the trap, assigning a "Wheel of Chaos" spin for other players or use them to spin the "Wheel of Fun" for themselves.

Though they don't know it yet, the Mystery, Inc. gang is about to have another mystery on their hands.

A minimum of two of the Scooby gang must participate in attempting to solve the mystery. If a single player is playing, the computer can be assigned to play an opposing character. Turns proceed in a hotseat fashion, where players take turns moving their characters. Each player gets three "action points" per turn and may use them for a variety of actions. Each action costs a certain number of points. For example, picking up a clue or Scooby snack costs one point, moving from one area to another costs all three, or taking the manhole (a shortcut to another random area) takes two points. Just walking about an area, not picking up anything, is free.

The "Wheel of Chaos" is assigned from one player to an opposing player. It costs one Scooby Snack. Spinning the wheel, much like a fortune teller's wheel, results in an unfortunate event for the receiving player, such as losing a turn, Scooby snacks or trap pieces. The receiving player may block the wheel by sacrificing a Scooby Snack. Meanwhile, the "Wheel of Fun" is the opposite of the "Wheel of Chaos". Spinning it gives some kind of bonus to the spinning player. It costs one Scooby snack to spin the wheel. Whenever a player has any Scooby snacks, he is given the option of spinning the wheel at the beginning of their turn.

Once the player finds three clues, they know who the culprit is and must set up a trap for them. The player must have three pieces to one trap and be in the correct area for the trap. The player must also bribe Scooby to be the bait for the trap with Scooby snacks. The number of snacks the player uses affects how likely the trap will work. Three snacks will always result in a successful trapping; one has a high failure rate. A player may attempt to trap the phantom before getting three clues, but this will always result in a bungled trap attempt. Once the suspect is trapped, they are unmasked and a Full motion video (FMV) clip describes their motive. Since the culprit is different from game to game, it has high replay value.

Shaggy talks to the clinically depressed clown while Velma contemplates her next move.

== Plot ==
The "Mystery Inc." gang find themselves stranded near an old farmhouse adjacent to an apparently abandoned amusement park. Approaching the farmhouse for help with the Mystery Machine (their van), the gang learns that the Gobs, the residents of the home, own the adjacent park, Gobs O' Fun. However, the park is being haunted by a phantom, scaring customers away. Without any customers, the Gobs are on the brink of bankruptcy, which will force them to sell the park. The gang agrees to help the Gobs find the culprit in exchange for help getting their van repaired.

== Development and release ==
The game went gold on October 6, 1999. The game was released in Europe in 2000 by Ubi Soft, who had entered into a deal with SouthPeak to distribute six of their titles in the territory as well as in Quebec.

== Reception ==
Reception

Review scores
Publication	Score
All Game Guide	2.5/5
Computer Games Magazine	4/5
IGN	5.2/10
Just Adventure	B+

In the United States, Mystery of the Fun Park Phantom appeared on PC Data's computer game sales rankings at #20 for June 2000, with an average retail price of $17. After dropping out of the top 20 in July, it rose to #18 for August. According to PC Data, its domestic sales in August alone were 18,979 units, for revenues of $309,879. The game was absent from the top 20 in September. By 2006, Mystery of the Fun Park Phantom had sold between 100,000 and 290,000 units in the United States.
