= Code of Openness =

Code of Openness (CPO)
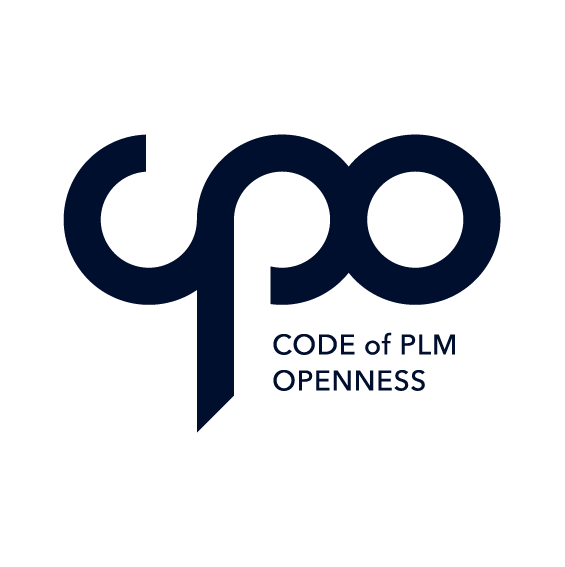
- Mission statement: "Establishing a common understanding on openness in IoT"
- Commercial?: No
- Owner: Hosted by prostep ivip & Owned by CPO Community
- Key people: 80 Companies
- Established: July 2011
- Website: www.prostep.org/en/cpo.html

Code of Openness (CPO) is an open initiative of prostep ivip under the patronage of the German Federal Ministry for Economic Affairs and Energy (German acronym: BMWi). The acronym CPO originally stands for the abbreviation of Code of PLM Openness.

Openness is a capability provided by an IT system, and it is characterized by interoperability, portability and extensibility. These capabilities are implemented using IT interfaces, standards and the IT architecture. All these are technical aspects of openness, Openness is also based on non-technical aspects, which are related to the partnership between the involved partners (IT customers, IT vendors and/or IT service providers). The development of the CPO was inspired by the spirit of a "code of conduct".

Thereby, the CPO goes far beyond the requirement to provide IT standards and related interfaces. It aims seamless connectivity and the easy integration of IT in networked IT-environments and therefore combines technological IT-requirements with those of IT customer and users. CPO a standard catalogue that defines measurable criteria (‘shall’, ‘should’, ‘may’) for the following categories: interoperability, infrastructure, extensibility, interfaces, standards, architecture as well as partnership.

== History ==
From July 2011 to February 2012 representatives of BMW, Daimler, Dassault Systèmes, IBM, Oracle, PTC, SAP, Siemens PLM Software, T-Systems and Volkswagen specified the first version of the CPO, which was publicly introduced by the CIO of BMW and Continental at a conference within the context of the CeBIT 2012.

In 2012 and 2013 the CPO was continuously enhanced. Since 2014 the internationalization as well as the industrial roll-out was driven forward actively. Companies including Airbus, Ford, Fuji Heavy Industries, Hino, Honda, Isuzu, Mazda, Mitsubishi, Nissan, Suzuki, ThyssenKrupp, Toyota, Volvo and Yamaha joined the initiative.

Within the following, it became more and more clear that the CPO Criteria do not only serve the original target PLM, but also for assuring openness in IoT scenarios. Consequently, in April 2016 the German Minister for Economic Affairs and Energy, Sigmar Gabriel, declared the patronage of the BMWi for the CPO: "The German industry relies on the fact, that smart products and services can be offered and applied globally. With regard to this, interoperability is the key. A certification assures trust with regard to the broad application of information and communication technology (ICT), removes technological barriers and boosts the power of the German economy."

== Certification ==
Together with the BMWi prostep ivip currently specifies the CPO-related certification procedure. Pilot-certifications have been conducted in 2017. Companies like CONWEAVER, HCL, PROSTEP, PTC and Siemens PLM were the first who received this certificate. In parallel, an accredited certification program is worked out together with the DAkkS. Additionally, related next steps on EU-level and in Japan (together with the METI) are planned.

== Publications ==
The CPO, Guidelines with hints and interpretation help, templates and the CPO annual report are published via the CPO-site of ProSTEP iViP. The CPO itself and associated certification criteria will be published as DIN SPEC 91372. The first part, DIN SPEC 91372-1:2018-03, is already available.
