= Animaniacs: A Gigantic Adventure =

1999 video game

- Developer: EAI Interactive
- Publisher: SouthPeak Interactive
- Platform: Windows
- Release: 1999
- Genre: Platformer
- Mode: Single-player

Animaniacs: a Gigantic Adventure is an action game developed by EAI Interactive and published by SouthPeak Interactive.

== Gameplay ==
The player follows Yakko, Wakko, and Dot as they search the Warner Brothers lot for movie reels, posters, and awards hidden by Ralph at Thaddeus J. Plotz's command, moving through eleven side‑scrolling levels. Each level assigns the player a specific Animaniac, with Dot throwing anvils and her brothers using a bat or mallet, and all three able to jump on rats and other creatures. The player navigates areas that demand running jumps, avoids hazards such as shooting fire, and occasionally solves small puzzles. Throughout the levels, the player collects numerous items, including food and film‑related objects, while progressing through environments rendered with 3D backgrounds and 2D characters.

== Plot ==
Thaddeus Plotz, after many years of dealing with Yakko, Wakko, and Dot, orders Ralph to round up all the Animaniacs merchandise and hide them around the studio. While doing that, Plotz orders all of the Warner Siblings be locked up in a psychiatric hospital. However, the three escape and the player must retrieve all of the hidden objects.

== Development ==
In May 1998, SouthPeak signed a multi-year deal with Warner Bros. Interactive Entertainment to develop PC games based on Looney Tunes, Pinky & the Brain, and the Animaniacs. Animaniacs: A Gigantic Adventure was released on MSN Gaming Zone on June 30, 1999. It was showcased at E3 1999.

== Reception ==
Reception

Review scores
Publication	Score
All Game Guide	4/5
FamilyPC	85%
GamePro	3/5
IGN	3.5/10
PC Joker	62%
PC Action	25%
PC Player	66%
Power Play	52%

IGN gave the game 3.5 out of 10 and called it "awful", while aggregator GameRankings gave it an above-average rating of 60%.

Games Domain found Animaniacs: A Gigantic Adventure to be difficult for children under the age of 6.
