= Mbe =

Mbe may refer to:

- Mbé, a town in the Republic of the Congo
- Mbe, Cameroon, a commune and town in Cameroon
- Mbe Mountains Community Forest, in Nigeria
- Mbe language, an Ekoid language of Nigeria
- Mbe' language, a Grassfields language of Cameroon
- Molale language, an ISO 639-3 code

== See also ==
- MBE (disambiguation)
