= Helmuth Ludwig =

Dr. Helmuth Ludwig
- Born: September 19, 1962 (age 64); Cologne, West Germany
- Education: University of Karlsruhe (MSc) University of Chicago (MBA) Christian-Albrechts-University, Kiel (PhD)
- Occupations: Business executive, academic
- Employer: Siemens AG
- Known for: Global Head of Information Technology at Siemens AG
- Title: Global Head of IT
- Term: October 2016 – present

Dr. Helmuth Ludwig (born September 19, 1962 in Cologne, West Germany) is Global Head of Information Technology at Siemens AG, to which he was appointed in October 2016. Ludwig has held a range of strategic leadership positions in his more than 20-year career at Siemens.

== Professional career ==
Ludwig joined Siemens in 1990 after graduating college. He has worked in corporate regional strategy development for the company in multiple countries including Germany, Kazakhstan, Argentina and United States.

When Siemens acquired PLM Software (now Siemens Digital Industries Software) in 2007, Ludwig was appointed president and is credited for successfully leading the integration of the organization’s 50 legal entities and multiple facilities across 26 countries into Siemens. He worked with the management team to develop long-term strategic direction. Siemens PLM software was recently used in the design of the Mars Rover ''Curiosity''. Ludwig is a regular speaker on advanced manufacturing topics including additive manufacturing, industrial software, automation and information integration.

He has delivered commencement addresses at Ira A. Fulton Schools of Engineering of Arizona State University (ASU) and at Southern Polytechnic State University (SPSU), where Siemens has had a longstanding relationship.

== Memberships and Associations ==
He currently teaches as an adjunct professor at Cox School of Business, Southern Methodist University, in Dallas covering International Corporate Strategy. He is a founding president of Rotary Club of Almaty, which is the first Rotary Club in Central Asia and cofounder and former president of Rotary International’s Spanish-German Executive Committee.

He is also a current board member of Siemens Industry, Inc. and Siemens Electrical Ltd., member on the Board of Trustees for Manufacturers Association for Productivity and Innovation (MAPI), a member of Dallas Committee on Foreign Relations (DCFR) and a former member of the Board of Trustees of Business School KIMEP University in Almaty, Kazakhstan.

== Education ==
Ludwig graduated from University of Karlsruhe, Germany in 1988 with a master's degree in industrial engineering. Over the course of his time at University of Karlsruhe, he completed several internships at Siemens AG, Arthur Andersen & Co. and McKinsey & Company, Inc.

In 1990, he received a Master of Business Administration from the University of Chicago and later completed his doctorate on ”Strategic Benchmarking of Multinational Companies” from the Christian-Albrechts-University in Kiel, Germany in 1996.

Ludwig is fluent in German, English and Spanish.
