= Engineering Animation =

US software company

Engineering Animation, Inc., or EAI, was a services and software company based in Ames, Iowa, United States. It remained headquartered there from its incorporation in 1990 until it was acquired in 2000 by Unigraphics Solutions, Inc., now a subsidiary of the German technology multinational Siemens AG. During its existence, EAI produced animations to support litigants in court, wrote and sold animation and visualization software, and developed a number of multimedia medical and computer game titles. Part of EAI's business now exists in a spin-off company, Demonstratives.

== History ==
EAI was incorporated in 1990 by Martin Vanderploeg, Jay Shannan, Jim Bernard, and Jeff Trom, all Ames-based engineers closely involved with Iowa State University's Virtual Reality Applications Center (VRAC) founded by Vanderpoeg and Bernard. Later that year they were joined by a former colleague of Vanderploeg's, Matthew Rizai, a mechanical engineer and software entrepreneur, who became CEO.

EAI got its start by producing computer animations to help illustrate crime scenes and other technical courtroom testimony for lawyers and expert witnesses, eventually branching out in to visualization applications in medicine, product design, and a wide range of other applications. In 1994, EAI launched VisLab, an animation package initially written to leverage the graphics capabilities of the SGI UNIX computer platform.

At the time, it was considered unusual in its ability to render complex animation in hardware rather than in software. Steve Ursenbach, general manager of SGI's Application Division commented, "VisLab is the first software program to take such advantage of our hardware rendering capabilities." VisLab's UI was based on the widely used Motif software.

EAI's computer-generated animations were used in reconstructing the TWA Flight 800 plane crash scenario and numerous crime scene investigations, including the murder of Nicole Brown Simpson and the Oklahoma City bombing for NBC's Inside Edition. In 1997, EAI collaborated with the American Bar Association Judicial Division Lawyers Conference to produce "Computer Animation in the Courtroom – A Primer," a CD-ROM introduction and guide to the use of computer animations in reconstructing crimes.

EAI's manufacturing clients included Ford, Motorola, Lockheed Martin, and 3M.

=== Visualization and collaboration ===
Based on the initial success of VisLab with automotive companies, EAI developed and released the first commercially viable 3D interactive visualization software package, VisFly, first on the SGI and later the HP and Sun platforms in 1995 and 1996. VisFly was eventually ported to Microsoft Windows and IBM AIX and expanded into the VisView and VisMockup product lines. Networking capabilities were subsequently added to VisFly via NetFly and to VisView/VisMockup via VisNetwork.

Providing the visualization software, tools, and network access methods to convert common CAD data into the JT visualization format were keys to this most successful of EAI's business ventures. Networking capabilities were eventually expanded further with e-Vis.com, which provided an internet-hosted environment and many of the features now seen in mainstream collaboration software.

=== EAI Interactive ===
By 1996, EAI began to broaden its scope of development. This led to EAI's purchase that year of a small video game developer in Salt Lake City, Utah, headed by Bryan Brandenburg. This new studio became the primary location of EAI Interactive's activities. The Salt Lake City office worked more or less independently, though from time to time it used the services of the main Ames office for overflow work.

As an independent game developer, EAI Interactive produced a variety of titles, including Barbie Magic Hair Styler, Trophy Buck for Sierra On-Line, Championship Bass for Electronic Arts, A Bug's Life for Disney Interactive, Clue and Outburst for Hasbro Interactive, and Scooby Doo: Mystery of the Fun Park Phantom and Animaniacs: A Gigantic Adventure for SouthPeak Games.

In addition to game development, EAI's medical and scientific illustration team developed a variety of 3D interactive educational products including The Dynamic Human for McGraw Hill and The Dissectible Human for Elsevier.

=== Recognition ===
In the September 1997 issue of Individual Investor magazine, EAI was named one of "America's Fastest Growing Companies." In the January 12, 1998, issue of Businessweek, the magazine recognized company CEO Rizai as one of seven notable entrepreneurs of 1997. In 1999, Forbes ASAP magazine ranked the company as one of the 100 most dynamic technology companies in the US, placing it twenty-third overall.

=== An international company ===
In its heyday, EAI had offices located across the US and around the world. The company's primary financial success was its visualization software VisFly, later renamed VisView. This product line lives on today as part of Teamcenter from Siemens Digital Industries Software after a series of acquisitions starting in 1999. The litigation supporting animation services portion of EAI continues as a spin-off company called Demonstratives, today a division of Engineering Systems Inc. (ESI), in Aurora, Illinois.

Former EAI employees have gone on to work at Pixar, Disney, Zygote Media Group, Hasbro, MediaTech, Milkshake Media, DreamWorks, and Maxis, among others. In 2008, Vanderploeg, Rizai, and others in the EAI management team founded Webfilings (now known as Workiva), a SaaS company specializing in corporate compliance solutions software, also headquartered in Ames.

== Products and services ==
=== Animation services and Special Effects ===
- The Discovery Channel Skyscraper at Sea (1995?)
- National Geographic Asteroids: Deadly Impact (1997)

=== Animation software ===
- VisLab (1994)
- VisModel (1996?)

=== Visualization software ===
- VisFly (1995)
- NetFly (1996)
- VisView (1997?)
- VisMockup (1998?)
- VisFactory (1998?)
- VisNetwork (1998)
- eVis.com (1999)

=== Multimedia titles ===
- Barbie Magic HairStyler
- Crayola Magic Coloring Book
- MicroType Multimedia
- The Dynamic Human

=== Computer games ===
- X-Fire (1997, unpublished)
- Legend of the Five Rings (1998, unpublished)
- Clue (1998)
- K'NEX: K'NEX Lost Mines (1998)
- Scooby Doo: Mystery of the Fun Park Phantom (1999)
- Trans-Am '68–'72 (unpublished)
- Small Soldiers
- Disney: A Bug's Life: ActivePlay
- Disney: Toy Story 2: Activity Center
- Animaniacs: A Gigantic Adventure
- Crazy Paint
- Clue Chronicles: Fatal Illusion (2000)
- Sierra: Trophy Buck
- Sierra: Trophy Hunting
- Hasbro: Outburst
- Championship Bass (2000)
