= ProSTEP iViP =

prostep ivip association
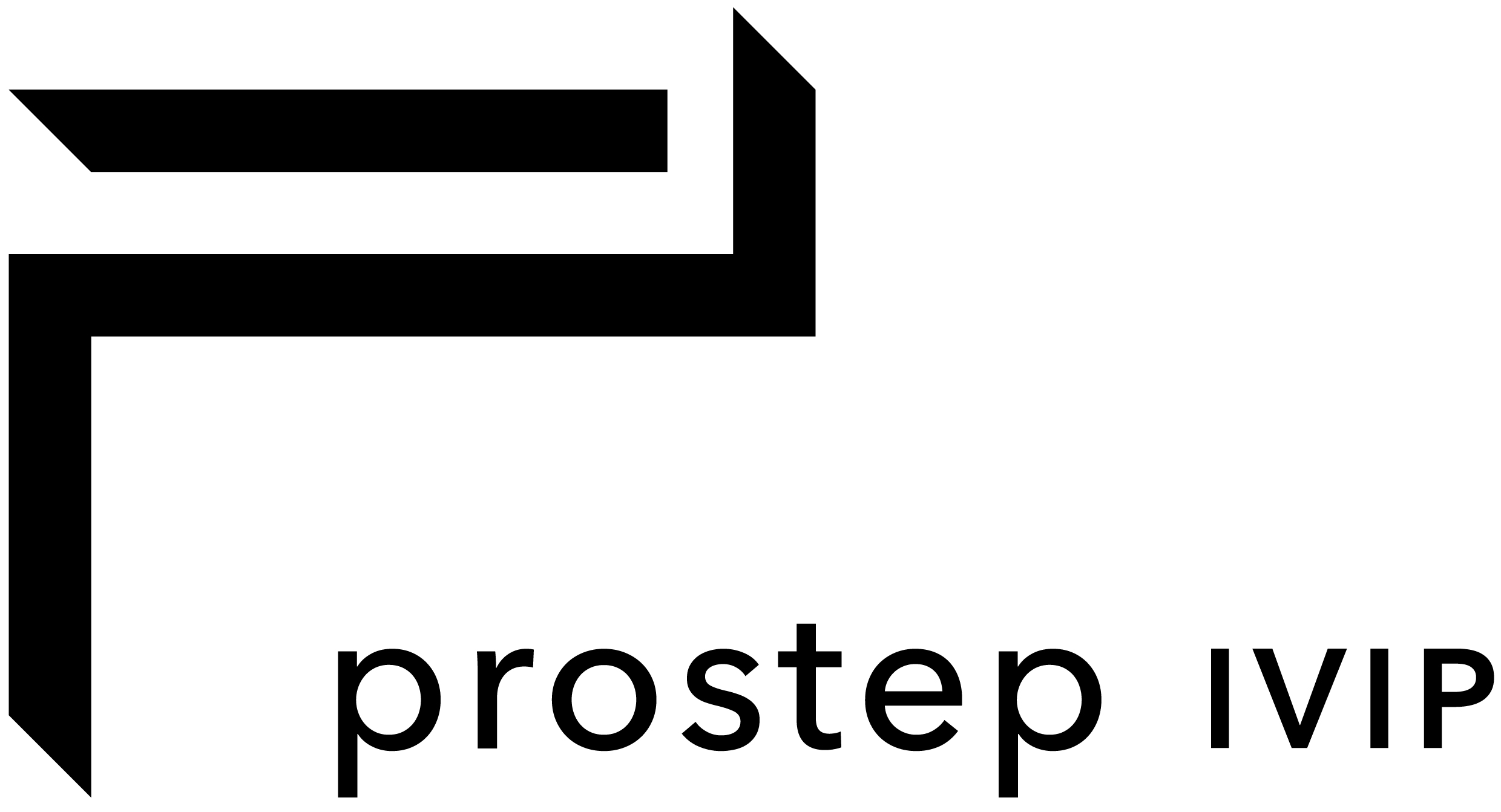
- Formation: 1993
- Type: Association
- Purpose: Digitalization
- Headquarters: Darmstadt, Germany
- Members: 180 Companies
- Board of directors: Dr. Henrik Weimer (Chair of the Board)
- Key people: Dr. Alain Pfouga (General Manager)
- Website: prostep.org

ProSTEP iViP is an association with its headquarters in Darmstadt, Germany. Founded in 1993 as the ProSTEP Association for the Promotion of Product Data Standards and later renamed to ProSTEP iViP Association in 2002, and since May 2017 the association's name has been written as "prostep ivip". Prostep ivip is a globally active, independent association of 180 member companies from industry, IT and research.

== History ==
After the end of the ProSTEP Initiative of the German Federal Ministry for Economic Affairs and Energy (German acronym: BMW), the ProSTEP Association was founded in 1993. Leading IT managers at BMW, Bosch, Continental, Daimler, Delphi, Opel, Siemens, Volkswagen and 30 other companies realized that the development of modern processes for efficient product data management was crucial to ensuring the ability of German companies to compete in the global marketplace and that they can address their common aims at best when joining under the neutral umbrella of an association.

== Organization ==
40% of today's 180 member companies in prostep ivip are manufacturing companies (manufacturers and suppliers), 40% are IT companies and service providers and 20% are research institutions and other standardization bodies. This tripartism is also reflected within the by-annually elected board of the association: one representative of the manufacturers, one of the suppliers, one of the IT and one of the research institutions. Prostep ivip's Technical Programme, with its currently over 20 running project groups, is governed by the Technical Steering Committee (TSC).

== Publications ==
ProSTEP iViP publishes Standards, Recommendations, White Paper and Best Practices together with its partner organizations. For example:

- ISO 10303-242:2014: STEP AP 242 - Managed model-based 3D engineering
- ISO 14306:2012: JT file format specification for 3D visualization
- OMG Requirements Interchange Format
- ASD-STAN EN 9300 / AIA NAS 9300 Long-term Archiving and Retrieval (LOTAR)
- VDA 4965 - Engineering Change Management (ECM)
- VDA 4968 - Vehicle Electric Container (VEC)
- PSI 11 - Smart Systems Engineering (SmartSE)
- PSI 12 - Manufacturing Change Management (MCM)
- PSI 13 - OEM-OEM and OEM-Joint Venture Collaboration (PDM to PDM)
- PSI 14 - JT Industrial Application Package, Format and Use Cases (JTIAP)
- PSI 15 - Enterprise Rights Management (ERM)
- PSI 16 - Code of Openness (CPO)
- DIN SPEC 91383 - JT Industrial Application Package (JTIAP)
- DIN SPEC 91372 - Code of PLM Openness (CPO) - IT Offenheitskriterien (CPO)

== Events ==
Each year in spring prostep ivip conducts one of the world's largest neutral PLM Congresses: the prostep ivip symposium.
