= Tecnomatix =

Software company

Tecnomatix Technologies, Ltd
- Company type: (formerly NASDAQ: TCNO)
- Industry: Software
- Founded: 1983; 43 years ago
- Defunct: 2005
- Fate: Acquired by UGS Corporation in 2005
- Headquarters: Tel Aviv, Israel
- Products: Manufacturing Process Management solutions Product lifecycle management solutions
- Revenue: $100.6 million (2004)
- Parent: Siemens
- Website: Tecnomatix: Siemens Software

Tecnomatix Technologies, Ltd. (formerly Nasdaq: TCNO) is a provider of Manufacturing Process Management and Product lifecycle management software to the electronics, automotive, aerospace and heavy equipment industries, currently owned by Siemens AG. Tecnomatix's eMPower is a suite of end-to-end Manufacturing Process Management solutions for the collaborative development and optimization of manufacturing processes across the extended enterprise and supply chain.

== History ==
Founded in Israel in 1983, the Tecnomatix Corporation provided Manufacturing Process Management (MPM) solutions for the automotive, electronics, aerospace and other manufacturing and processing industries. The Tecnomatix products suite offered software and services in all process monitoring and control, production management and execution.

Shlomo Dovrat was the founder of Tecnomatix and served as CEO and President from its inception until 1995. In 1993, Dovrat led Tecnomatix's IPO on the NASDAQ (TCNO). He served as Chairman of the Board of Directors from 1995 until December 2001. In 1994, Dovrat was succeeded as CEO by Harel Beit-On (also the company's President. In 2001 Beit-On was appointed Chairman of the Board of Directors, and served as Chairman until the company's acquisition in 2005.

In 1999, Tecnomatix acquired Unicam Software Inc., a provider of production engineering software to the printed circuit board (PCB) assembly market.

In 2003, Tecnomatix acquired USDATA Corporation. USDATA was the creator of the supervisory-level control (SCADA) product FactoryLink, and the manufacturing execution systems (MES) product Xfactory.

In 2005, Tecnomatix was acquired by the UGS Corporation and the Tecnomatix product was combined with UGS' existing MPM solutions. The current Tecnomatix software line includes Part Manufacturing, Assembly Planning, Resource Planning, Plant Simulation, Human Performance, Quality, Production Management, Manufacturing Data Management.

In January 2007 UGS was purchased by Siemens AG, and today the Tecnomatix solutions are available from Siemens Digital Industries Software. Siemens Digital Industries Software announced Tecnomatix version 9 in June 2009.

== See also ==
- UGS Corporation
- Manufacturing Process Management
- Product lifecycle management
