= Requirements Modeling Framework =

Eclipse Requirements Modeling Framework
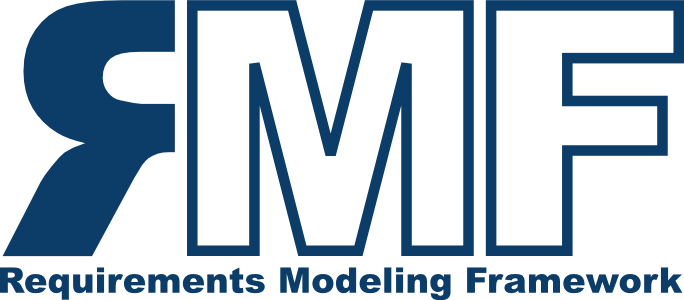

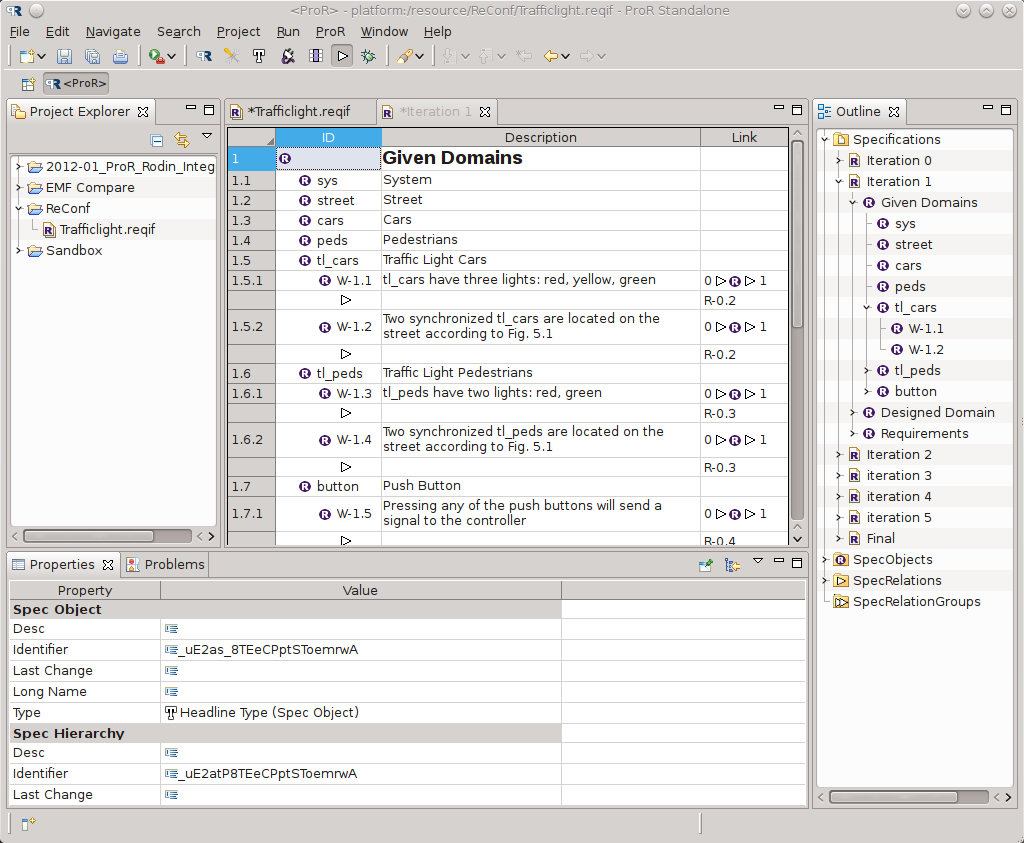
- Stable release: 0.10.0 or 0.14.0, depending on the eclipse version / unknown
- Repository: github.com/eclipse-rmf/org.eclipse.rmf
- Operating system: cross-platform
- Platform: Eclipse
- Type: Computer-aided software engineering
- License: Eclipse Public License
- Website: eclipse.org

The Requirements Modeling Framework (RMF) is an open-source software framework for working with requirements based on the ReqIF standard. RMF consists of a core allowing reading, writing and manipulating ReqIF data, and a user interface allowing to inspect and edit request data.

RMF is the first and, currently, the only open-source reference implementation of the ReqIF standards. Noteworthy is the fact that RMF has already been deployed in the ProStep ReqIF Implementor Forum in order to ensure the interoperability of the commercial implementation. Since 2011 there have been reports in the German and in the international press about RMF.

== History ==
RMF has been in development under the name ProR since 2009 in the scope of the DEPLOY research project, collaborative efforts quickly developed with the research project Verde resulting in significant acceleration of development. At this point, the data model is based on RIF, the predecessor of ReqIF.

In June 2011, a proposal was created to transform the code into an Eclipse Foundation project. This proposal was adopted in November 2011. A part of the migration to the Eclipse Foundation was the conversion of RIF to the current version of ReqIF 1.0.1.

In the spring of 2012 DEPLOY and Verde opted out of the research projects. Nevertheless, RMF keeps on evolving, within the framework of the research project Advance. From Formal Mind free extensions to ProR under the name ProR Essentials are developed.

Currently neither version 0.14 nor 0.13 can be integrated into the latest version of eclipse, neither ProR nor RMF. Only version 0.10.0 remains, reasons for that are unknown. Version 0.13 (from the release folder) and version 0.14 (from the latest folder) can be integrated into eclipse version "Mars.2 Release (4.5.2)".

== Functionality ==
The RMF core allows for storing, writing, validating and manipulating ReqIF files. The manipulation of data is implemented programmatically using EMF.

ProR additionally enables the interactive creation, inspecting and editing of ReqIF models. The requirements are then presented in configurable tables. Links between requirements can be created via Drag & Drop, or through context menus.

== Integration with other tools ==
ProR is designed for integration with other Eclipse-based tools. There is an extension point available, which makes it possible to integrate other available renderers and editors, or to react to Drag & Drop events from outside.

As part of DEPLOY and Advance, the integration of Event-B models was developed.

The TOPCASED -project has now, as suggested, integrated RMF.

Further integrations have been proposed or implemented in a prototype.
