= Simcenter STAR-CCM+ =

Engineering software by Siemens

- Simcenter STAR-CCM+ running on Windows 10
- Developer: Siemens PLM Software
- Initial release: 2004
- Stable release: Version 2302
- Platform: Linux, Windows
- Available in: English, Japanese, Chinese, Korean
- Type: Computational fluid dynamics and multiphysics simulation
- License: Proprietary
- Website: Simcenter STAR-CCM+ website

Simcenter STAR-CCM+ is a commercial Computational Fluid Dynamics (CFD) based simulation software developed by Siemens Digital Industries Software. Simcenter STAR-CCM+ allows the modeling and analysis of a range of engineering problems involving fluid flow, heat transfer, stress, particulate flow, electromagnetics and related phenomena.

Formerly known as STAR-CCM+, the software was first developed by CD-adapco and was acquired by Siemens Digital Industries Software as part of the purchase of CD-adapco in 2016. It is now a part of the Simcenter Portfolio of software tools.

== History ==
Development work on STAR-CCM+ was started after a decision was taken to design a new, integrated CFD tool to replace the existing product STAR-CD which had been developed during the 1980s and 1990s by Computational Dynamics Ltd, a spin-off company from an Imperial College London CFD research group. STAR-CD was widely used most notably in the automotive industry. STAR-CCM+ aimed to take advantage of more modern programming methods and to provide an expandable framework.

STAR-CCM+ was announced at the 2004 AIAA Aerospace Sciences Conference in Reno, Nevada. A unique feature was a generalized polyhedral cell formulation, allowing the solver to handle any mesh type imported. The first official release included the first commercially available polyhedral mesher, offering faster model convergence compared to an equivalent tetrahedral mesh.

== Development ==
Simcenter STAR-CCM+ is developed according to a continual improvement process, with a new version released every four months. The program uses a client-server architecture, implemented using object-oriented programming.

== Capabilities ==
Simcenter STAR-CCM+ is primarily Computational fluid dynamics software which uses the Finite element analysis or Finite volume method to calculate the transport of physical quantities on a discretized mesh. For fluid flow the Navier–Stokes equations are solved in each of the cells. Simcenter STAR-CCM+ has multiphysics capabilities including:

- Fluid flow through porous media
- Multiphase flow
  - Discrete element method
  - Volume of fluid method
- Non-Newtonian fluid
- Rheology
- Turbulence
- Viscoelasticity

== Release history ==
Version	Release date
1.04	October 2004
1.06	December 2004
1.08	January 2005
2.02	November 2005
2.04	October 2006
2.06	February 2007
3.02	March 2008
3.04	July 2008
3.06	November 2008
4.02	March 2009
4.04	July 2009
4.06	November 2009
5.02	February 2010
5.04	June 2010
5.06	October 2010
6.02	March 2011
6.04	July 2011
6.06	October 2011
7.02	March 2012
7.04	June 2012
7.06	November 2012
8.02	March 2013
8.04	June 2013
8.06	October 2013
9.02	February 2014
9.04	June 2014
9.06	October 2014
10.02	February 2015
10.04	June 2015
10.06	October 2015
11.02	February 2016
11.04	June 2016
11.06	October 2016
12.02	February 2017
12.04	June 2017
12.06	October 2017
13.02	February 2018
13.04	June 2018
13.06	October 2018
2019.1	February 2019
2019.2	June 2019
2019.3	October 2019
2020.1	February 2020
2020.2	June 2020
2020.3	October 2020
2021.1	February 2021
2021.2	June 2021
2021.3	October 2021
2022.1	February 2022
2206	June 2022
2210	October 2022
2302	February 2023
2306	June 2023
2310	October 2023
2402	February 2024
2410	October 2024
2502	February 2025
2506	June 2025
2510	October 2025
2602	February 2026

== Usage ==
Prior to CD-adapco's acquisition by Siemens, the customer base was approximately 3,200 accounts with 52% of licence sales attributed to the automotive industry.

== See also ==
- Computational fluid dynamics
- Computer simulation
- Computer-aided design
- Computer-aided engineering
- List of computational fluid dynamics software
