= Siemens Digital Industries Software =

American computer software company

- Type: Strategic business unit
- Industry: CAD/CAM/CAE/PLM Software
- Predecessor: UGS Corp.
- Founded: 1963, Torrance, California (as United Computing); 2007, Plano, Texas (as Siemens PLM Software)
- Headquarters: Plano, Texas, U.S.
- Key people: Tony Hemmelgarn, Bob Jones, Bernd Haetzel
- Products: PLM software and services — Teamcenter, NX, Simcenter, Tecnomatix, Velocity Series, COMOS; EDA software and services (formerly Mentor Graphics)
- Number of employees: 24,000 (2023)
- Parent: McDonnell Douglas (1976–1991); Electronic Data Systems (1991–2004); UGS Corp. (2004–2007); Siemens (2007–present)
- Website: www.sw.siemens.com

Siemens Digital Industries Software (formerly UGS and then Siemens PLM Software) is an American computer software company specializing in 3D & 2D Product Lifecycle Management (PLM) software. The company is a business unit of Siemens, operates under the legal name of Siemens Industry Software Inc, and is headquartered in Plano, Texas.

== History ==
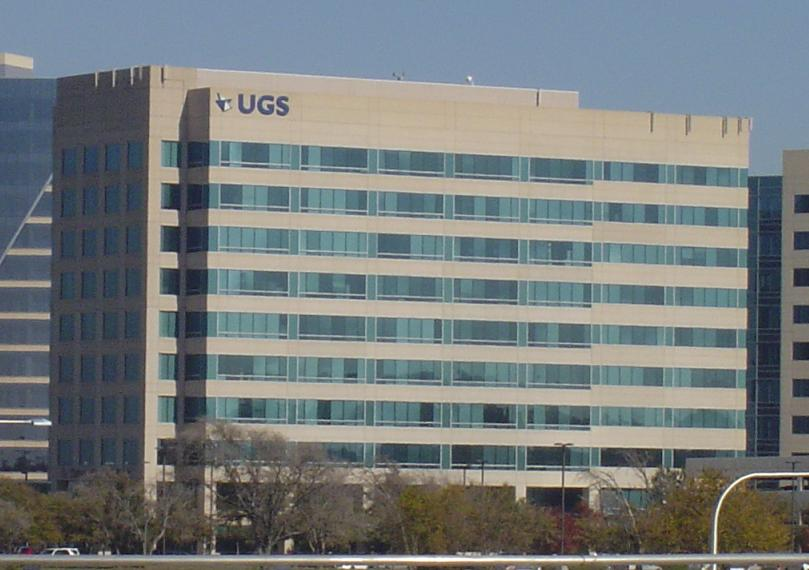
Siemens PLM Software Headquarters in Plano, Texas

=== Evolution of Siemens PLM from UGS: 1963–2007 ===
The first commercial product developed by what is now known as Siemens PLM Software was called UNIAPT, released in 1969 by a software company then called United Computing. UNIAPT was one of the world's first end-user CAM products. United Computing was founded in 1963 above a hair salon in Torrance, California, and went on to purchase the Automated Drafting and Machining (ADAM) software code from MCS in 1973. The code became a foundation for a product called UNI-GRAPHICS, later sold commercially in 1975 as Unigraphics.

The following year, United Computing was acquired by the aerospace company McDonnell Douglas (now part of Boeing), who created new CAD/CAM divisions, naming one the Unigraphics Group. Finally, in 1980, Unigraphics was released, marking the group's first true 3D modeling hardware and software offering. Already home to McDonnell Douglas, the Unigraphics Group grew in St. Louis, Missouri, which became the new headquarters.

In 1991, the McDonnell Douglas Systems Integration groups, including Unigraphics, were acquired by EDS (then a part of General Motors Corp., later part of HP Enterprise Services, now part of DXC Technology). EDS branded the acquired business as EDS Unigraphics. Eventually, in 1997 EDS set up its Unigraphics division as a wholly owned subsidiary called Unigraphics Solutions. EDS took Unigraphics Solutions public while continuing to own majority controlling shares in Unigraphics. During this time, Unigraphics acquired a few companies itself including Engineering Animation, Inc., the former Ames, Iowa-based visualization company.

In 1999 the company acquired Applicon, a long-term player in the EDA (Electronic Design Automation) field.

Unigraphics changed its name to UGS Corporation in 2001. Also that year, EDS repurchased all outstanding UGS stock, and acquired a UGS competitor, SDRC. In 2003 UGS also received a perpetual, royalty-free license to the MSC Nastran source code. UGS, SDRC, and Nastran were merged into a single Line of Business (LOB) named EDS PLM Solutions.

In 2004, EDS sold its EDS PLM Solutions business to the private equity group of Bain Capital, Silver Lake Partners, and Warburg Pincus. The company resumed operating under the UGS name following the private equity sale.

In 2005, UGS purchased Tecnomatix Technologies Ltd.

On January 24, 2007 the German electronics giant Siemens AG announced that they would acquire UGS for $3.5 billion. Helmuth Ludwig was appointed president and worked with the management team on creating a long-term strategic direction.

=== Siemens PLM: 2007–2019 ===
The 2007 acquisition of UGS laid the foundation for the Strategic business unit of Siemens Industry Automation division - Siemens PLM Software. The entire operations of UGS were amalgamated into Siemens Automation & Drives group as Siemens PLM Software.

In October 2008, to expand its portfolio, Siemens acquired Schwelm based 'Innotec GmbH' - an international vendor of digital engineering software and services for the process industry, and known for its COMOS platform.

On November 9, 2011, Siemens announced the acquisition of 'Vistagy, Inc.' - a Massachusetts-based supplier of specialized engineering software and services with emphasis on designing and manufacturing structures made of advanced composite materials.

The Siemens Industry Automation Division has acquired the software companies UGS (USA, 2007), Innotec (Germany, 2008), Elan Software Systems (France, 2009), Active Tecnologia em Sistemas de Automação (Brazil, 2011), Vistagy (USA, 2011), IBS AG (Germany, 2012), Perfect Costing Solutions GmbH (Germany, 2012), VRcontext International S.A. (Belgium, 2012), and LMS International (Belgium, 2012).

In December 2013, in order to enhance its portfolio in the field of PLM-ERP integration and provide platform for integration with enterprise resource planning systems (such as SAP, Oracle and other enterprise applications such as MES, CRM and SCM), Siemens Industry Software Gmbh & Co. KG acquired Munich based TESIS PLMware Gmbh, in the field of PLM integration software and services.

In November 2015, Siemens announced the acquisition of Polarion Software, a developer of application lifecycle management (ALM) software. The acquisition was completed in 2016, and Siemens Industry Software acquired Polarion's Czech business on 1 July that year.

In January 2016, Siemens announced its intention to acquire CD-adapco for US$970 million.

In October 2016, Tony Hemmelgarn became president and CEO (his previous position was executive vice president for global sales, marketing and service delivery). Previous president and CEO, Chuck Grindstaff, became Executive Chairman (earlier Grindstaff was appointed CEO of Siemens PLM in 2010, when he succeeded the former leader, Tony Affuso).

In November 2016, Siemens announced plans to acquire EDA company Mentor Graphics for $4.5 billion to incorporate electronics integrated circuit and systems design, simulation, and manufacturing solutions into its portfolio. Mentor Graphics became styled as "Mentor, a Siemens Business".

On October 1, 2018, Siemens announced it had acquired Low-code development platform software company Mendix to enable it to create SaaS solutions based on the Mendix platform.

=== Siemens Digital Industries Software: 2019-current ===
Announced on September 4, 2019, it was announced at the Siemens Media & Analyst Conference that the formal name of the company changed from Siemens PLM Software to Siemens Digital Industries Software.

In January 2021, the legal merger of Mentor Graphics with Siemens was completed - merging into the Siemens Industry Software Inc legal entity. Mentor Graphics' name was changed to Siemens EDA, a division of Siemens Digital Industries Software.

In November 2022, it was announced Siemens Digital Industries Software had acquired the Tewksbury, Massachusetts-headquartered simulation-independent verification IP supplier, Avery Design Systems.

In 2023, Siemens Digital Industries Software was listed by the Special Advisory Council for Myanmar as being among the companies that had assisted the weapons production of Myanmar's military junta and could be at risk of being complicit in its violation of human rights.

In 2025, Siemens acquired Altair Engineering for $10 billion, integrating the company into its Digital Industries division.

== Products ==
Siemens Digital Industries Software products include the former Siemens PLM product lines which include CAD software like NX, a CAD/CAM/CAE commercial software suite, Teamcenter, an integrated set of Product Lifecycle Management (PLM) and collaboration (cPD) tools, Tecnomatix, a manufacturing and factory planning suite and Velocity Series, an application bundle focused at the mid-market that includes Solid Edge.

The company's portfolio also contained NX I-deas, NX Nastran, Solid Edge, Imageware, Tecnomatix, Femap, Simcenter 3D, Simcenter Amesim, Simcenter Flotherm, Simcenter Flomaster, Simcenter FLOEFD, Simcenter STAR-CCM+, Simcenter Culgi, and Parasolid.

Siemens DISW offers the Mendix Low-code development platform. The Mendix Platform is designed to accelerate enterprise app delivery across the entire Systems development life cycle, from ideation to deployment and operations.

With the acquisition of Mentor Graphics (now Siemens EDA), the product portfolio expanded significantly to include all of the Mentor product lines which includes:

- the Calibre product line for IC Physical Verification and Design for Manufacturing
- the Tessent product line for Silicon Test and Yield Analysis
- the Veloce product line for Hardware Assisted Verification
- the Questa product line for digital simulation and verification and formal verification
- Analog and AMS solutions including AFS, AFS Symphony, Solido, and Eldo
- PCB layout and design tools such as PADS, Xpedition, HyperLynx and Valor NPI
- as well as solutions for IC design and layout, High Level Synthesis, Power Analysis, IC Place & Route, and other areas

=== Software components ===
As of 2023 3D Software Development components provided by Siemens included different PLM tools:

- D-Cubed (used by Bentley (AEC), Vero (CAM), Altair (CAE), Onshape (CAD), and Solid Edge (CAD))
- JT file format,
- PLM Vis,
- PLM XML

== See also ==
- List of Siemens products for manufacturing IT
- Mentor Graphics
