= CD-adapco =

US-based computer software company

- Type: Privately Held
- Industry: CAE software
- Founded: Melville, New York (1980)
- Defunct: 25 January 2016
- Headquarters: Melville, New York, US
- Products: STAR-CCM+ STAR-CD; STAR-Design
- Owner: Peter Steven MacDonald, President (deceased 2015)
- Number of employees: ~900 (2016) working at 34 different offices across the globe.
- Website: www.cd-adapco.com

CD-adapco was a multinational computer software company that authored and distributed applications used for computer-aided engineering, best known for its computational fluid dynamics (CFD) products. In 2016 the company was acquired by Siemens Digital Industries Software.

== Origins ==
Analysis and Design Application Company (stylized "adapco") was founded in New York in 1980 as an engineering consultancy company focusing on finite element method analysis. In 1987, Adapco invested in and began to collaborate with Computational Dynamics, a startup company formed by members of a CFD research group at Imperial College London. Eventually the two companies began to jointly trade under the name CD-adapco.

In their 2009 annual user conference, CD-adapco announced that the company had grown 22% in 2008, and they expected similar results in 2009. Professional Engineering Magazine described this as "recession-proof performance" and went on to point out that this success is especially noteworthy considering that many of the company's customers are in the automotive industry, a sector of the economy that was, at the time, suffering record low sales levels. During the financial downturn of 2009, CD-adapco launched their "No Engineer Left Behind" program, which provided free STAR-CCM+ licenses and training for displaced and unemployed engineers. In April 2016, Siemens acquired CD-adapco for US$970 million.

== Products ==
A screenshot of a fluid-flow analysis being conducted in STAR-CCM+

=== STAR-CD ===
CD-adapco's legacy CFD package, STAR-CD, was praised by Renault automotive design engineers as a "world class design package". Nearly 75% of the points won during the 2005 Formula One season were awarded to drivers of cars that were designed with STAR-CD.

=== STAR-CCM+ ===
In 2004, CD-adapco opted to shift their attention from improving STAR-CD to completely rewriting their computational fluid dynamics (CFD) algorithms and tools. The company gambled that in the end, starting from a "blank slate" with a group of experts would produce a better result than continuing to work improvements into their old products In early 2004, the company introduced this new product, STAR-CCM+, the "CCM" standing for "computational continuum mechanics". The application employs a client-server architecture, to allow users to solve problems from a lightweight computer, such as a laptop, while the computationally expensive math is done on a remote machine. This substantially reduces the need for expensive desktop computers—a requirement of some other similar packages

Even in periods of major economic downturn, few customers cut back on annual licenses. CD-adapco has speculated that their product's success has been partially because their application was designed from the start to simultaneously solve fluid flow and heat transfer problems. Competing products often consist of separate solvers coupled together, which requires that both be kept in agreement; a time-consuming complication that degrades accuracy.

=== STAR-CAD ===
STAR-CAD is a range of product lifecycle management-embedded tools that allows engineers to perform computational fluid dynamics analysis from within their company's chosen computer-aided design environment. STAR-CAD integrates with CATIA, Pro/Engineer, SolidWorks and NX.

=== Fuel cells ===
In a partnership with the United States Department of Energy, CD-adapco developed an expert system to model and analyze solid oxide fuel cells

== Technology ==
A simple valve discretized into finite volume cells using CD-adapco's polyhedral mesher

=== Meshing of computational domain ===
The first release of STAR-CCM+ included the world's first commercially available polyhedral meshing algorithm. The use of a polyhedral mesh has proven to be more accurate for fluid-flow problems than a hexahedral or tetrahedral mesh of a similar size (number of cells), but is considerably more difficult to create.

=== Automatic surface repair ===
Included in STAR-CCM+ is a tool called a "surface wrapper", which "shrink wraps" a user's computer-aided design geometry, filling any holes, overlaps or cracks. The company says that this feature cuts geometry preparation time down from days to minutes.

== Siemens acquisition ==
Siemens and CD-adapco have entered into a stock purchase agreement for the acquisition of CD-adapco by Siemens for a purchase price of $970 million.

== See also ==
- Computer simulation
