= Scoobie Snack =

Hamburger sold primarily in Glasgow, Scotland

The Scoobie Snack is a hamburger sold primarily at the Maggie snack bar in Glasgow, Scotland. It is a popular fast food item with students.

== Composition ==
The Scoobie Snack consists of a hamburger, a sliced sausage, a bacon rasher, a potato scone, a fried egg and a slice of processed cheese, all contained within a floured hamburger bun and accompanied by tomato ketchup and brown sauce. Fried onions are also offered as an optional extra.

The Scoobie Snack, because of the sausage, cheese, bacon and egg, takes similar resemblance to a breakfast roll but is often eaten at lunchtime. It is also eaten late at night by drunken Glaswegians as a greasy drunken snack that may or may not help ease the hangover process.

The Scooby Snack's invention is accredited to The Maggie Snack Bar, a food truck located for over 50 years at the intersection of Byres Road and Great Western Road.

== Derivatives ==
A derivative, the Super Scooby, was invented by The Jolly Fryer café in Bristol in 2009. It consists of four 110 g (1/4 lb) beef patties, eight rashers of bacon, eight slices of cheese, 12 onion rings and six slices of tomato in a sesame seed bun, accompanied by salad, lettuce, barbecue sauce and mayonnaise.

Standing 20 cm (8 in) tall, the sandwich provides 11,070 kJ (2,645 kcal) of food energy, which is more than the recommended daily intake of an adult male. The sandwich cost £10 and came with chips; if both the burger and chips were consumed in one sitting, customers are given a free Diet Coke. The jolly fryer closed in 2018
