= Digital factory =

A digital factory uses digital technology for modeling, communications and to operate the manufacturing process. This arrangement of technology allows managers to configure, model, simulate, assess and evaluate items, procedures and system before the factory is constructed. The digital factory gives answers for configuration, design, screen and control of a production system.

== Operation ==
Specialists can plan items, check and dissect assembly, manufacture-ability and serviceability. They can prepare automated and manual procedures for operating the facility. Procedures are confirmed and improved and plan mistakes remedied before beginning operations.

== See also ==
- Simulation in manufacturing systems
- Computer-aided manufacturing
- 3D modeling
