= Vistagy =

- Industry: Computer Aided Design
- Founded: 1991
- Headquarters: Waltham, MA, United States
- Key people: Steve Luby
- Products: Computer Aided Design
- Parent: Siemens AG
- Website: www.vistagy.com

VISTAGY, Inc. is a business segment within the Siemens Digital Industries Software business unit and is located in Waltham, Massachusetts, USA. VISTAGY is a provider of engineering software and services focused on the specific requirements of vertical industries, including aerospace, automotive, marine, and wind energy. The company has sales and support offices throughout North and South America, Asia, and Europe.

Siemens acquired VISTAGY in December 2011.

== History ==
VISTAGY was founded by Steve Luby, president and CEO, in 1991.

== Products ==
VISTAGY products are fully integrated into commercial 3D computer–aided–design platforms, including Siemens NX, Dassault Systèmes CATIA V4 and V5, and PTC Creo.

VISTAGY's software applications include:

- FiberSIM for designing and manufacturing composite structures
- SyncroFIT for designing and manufacturing airframe assemblies and large aerostructures
- Quality Planning Environment (QPE) for developing plans to assess aerostructure quality
- Seat Design Environment for designing and manufacturing transportation seat systems and interior components

The company supplies manufacturers in the aerospace, wind energy, automotive, and marine industries, including Bombardier Aerospace, General Motors, NASA, Nordex, Lotus Renault GP, and Howaldtswerke-Deutsche Werft (HDW).
