= SDRC =

American software company

Structural Dynamics Research Corporation
- Industry: aerospace/defense automotive and transportation fabrication and assembly
- Founded: 1967, Cincinnati, Ohio
- Defunct: 2001
- Fate: Now part of Siemens Digital Industries Software
- Successor: Siemens Digital Industries Software
- Headquarters: Milford, Ohio
- Key people: William Weyand, CEO; Glen Weinkoop, COO; Albert Klosterman, CTO
- Products: PLM software and services — Metaphase, I-DEAS
- Subsidiaries: Metaphase, Inc.

SDRC (Structural Dynamics Research Corporation) is a leading company specializing in MCAE (Mechanical Computer Aided Engineering) and PLM (Product Lifecycle Management) software.

== History ==
SDRC was formed by engineers, led by then associate professor Dr. Jason R. Lemon, from the University of Cincinnati in 1967, as a consulting company specializing in structural dynamics, or how mechanical parts vibrate. US Steel was a primary customer and early investor, until selling their shares to General Electric in the early 80's.

To aid in its consulting, the company wrote software to simulate and predict vibration. Companies began asking for rights to use this software, and thus SDRC entered the software market. In the 70s, SDRC became known as a Finite Element and Modelling company, and during the 80s and 90s became one of the leading companies in solid modeling and analysis. SDRC (Lemon) is well known globally as one of the first to coin the term "MCAE" (Mechanical Computer Aided Engineering) in the 70's. Dr. Lemon left SDRC in 1982 to form a new start up in 1983, International TechneGroup Incorporated; focused on applying CAE early in product development to lead design, a methodology known as CP/PD (Concurrent Product and Process Development).

Among several technologies pioneered by SDRC, it was one of the first companies to introduce a Product Lifecycle Management (PLM) solution, as a result of its joint venture with Control Data. The product, Metaphase, eventually became the sole property of SDRC.

=== Financial scandal ===
On September 14, 1994, SDRC announced that it would be forced to restate its previously-announced earnings. Months later, it was revealed that the Company had overstated its revenue over the three previous years by a combined total of $68 million, citing improprieties in its Far East reseller operations. After the scheme was disclosed, $30 million in SDRC software was discovered in a warehouse at Cincinnati/Northern Kentucky International Airport.

On April 11, 1997, the former chairman of SDRC and four other former company executives agreed to pay $1.5 million to settle charges that the Milford software company artificially inflated earnings and revenues from 1992 to 1994. Vice president Tony Tolani paid the government $1 million; Chairman/CEO Ron Friedsam was fined $100,000; CFO Ron Hoffman paid $200,000, VP Robert Fischer, $157,000; and Controller Dick LaJoie, $25,000. The resulting class-action shareholder lawsuit was settled on November 21, 1997, with SDRC agreeing to pay $37.5 million in payouts to affected shareholders.

The SEC also sanctioned the KPMG audit partners responsible for independent audits of company financials at the time. Philip Present and William Scanlon were sanctioned by the SEC, with restrictions on their accounting practice and ability to represent public companies imposed by SEC action. " Present and Scanlon were also aware that audit differences, representing 22% of the net income originally reported by SDRC for 1993, were not reflected in SDRC's 1993 financial statements"

=== Acquisition ===
SDRC was purchased by EDS in 2001 for a reported $950 million. SDRC was merged with EDS subsidiary UGS Corp. The new combined company operated as EDS PLM Solutions from 2001 through 2004. EDS sold off its CAD/PLM software business to a group of private equity firms in 2004. The new UGS Corp. operated as an independent, privately held company before being purchased by Siemens AG in 2007.

== Products ==
I-DEAS was SDRC's computer-aided design software package. SDRC was bought by Electronic Data Systems in 2001. Unigraphics and I-DEAS were merged into one product, NX. I-DEAS is still published by Siemens Digital Industries Software (formerly known as UGS Corp).

Metaphase was SDRC's product lifecycle management product. It was designed and best suited for managing CAD data. Metaphase is now published under the Teamcenter Enterprise name by Siemens Digital Industries Software.
