= Collaborative product development =

Business strategy

Collaborative product development (collaborative product design) (CPD) is a business strategy, work process and collection of software applications that facilitates different organizations to work together on the development of a product. It is also known as collaborative product definition management (cPDM).

== Introduction ==
Collaborative product development helps individual users and companies manage, share and view your CAD projects without the cost and complexity of purchasing an entire PDM or PLM solution. CPD comes in the form of a software as a service delivery model, which allows for rapid iterations and little or no downloads and installs.

Exactly what technology comes under this title does vary depending on whom one asks; however, it usually consists of the product lifecycle management (PLM) areas of: product data management (PDM); product visualization; team collaboration and conferencing tools; and supplier sourcing software. It is generally accepted as not including CAD geometry tools, but does include data translation technology.

== Technologies and methods used ==
Clearly general collaborative software such as email and chat (instant messaging) is used within the CPD process. One important technology is application and desktop sharing, allowing one person to view what another person is doing on a remote machine. For CAD and product visualization applications an ‘appshare’ product that supports OpenGL graphics is required. Another common application is Data sharing via Web based portals.

=== Specific to product data ===
With product data an important addition is the handling of high volumes of geometry and metadata. Exactly what techniques and technology is required depends on the level of collaboration being carried out and the commonality (or lack thereof) of the partner sites’ systems.

=== Specific to PLM and CAx collaboration ===
Collaboration using PLM and CAx tools requires technology to support the needs of:

1. People: Personnel of different disciplines and skill levels;
2. Organizations: Organizations throughout an enterprise or extended enterprise with different rules, processes and objectives;
3. Data: Data from different sources in different formats.

Appropriate technologies are required to support collaboration across these boundaries.

People

Effective PLM collaboration will typically require the participation of people who do not have high level CAD skills. This requires improved user interfaces including tailorable user interfaces that can be tailored to the skill level and specialty of the user.

Visualization of simulated airflow over an engine

Improved visualization capabilities, especially those that provide a meaningful view of complex information such as the results of a fluid flow analysis will leverage the value of all participants in the collaboration process. Effective collaboration requires that a participant be freed from the burden of knowing the intent history typically imbedded within and constricting the use of parametric models.

Organizations

Community collaboration requires that companies, suppliers, and customers share information in a secure environment, ensure compliance with enterprise and regulatory rules and enforce the process management rules of the community as well as the individual organizations.

Data

The most basic collaboration data need is the ability to operate in a MultiCAD environment. That is, however, only the beginning. Models from multiple CAD sources must be assembled into an active digital mockup allowing change and/or design in context.

==== Real-time collaborative product design ====
Product design is typically a highly iterative and interactive activity involving a group of designers who are geographically dispersed. A neutral modeling commands (NMC) based method is proposed to construct a real-time collaborative product design platform within heterogeneous CAD systems. Different from the visualization-based approaches, models can be constructed and modified synchronously from various sites in the proposed collaborative design environment. Based on a translation mechanism between system modeling operations (SMO) and neutral modeling commands (NMC), every operation given by a user on one site will be translated into a NMC and be sent to all the other sites through the network. When the other sites receive this command, it is converted into corresponding SMOs on the local system. In this way, the real-time collaborative product design with heterogeneous CAD systems is achieved.

=== Different levels of collaboration ===
If the collaborating parties have the same PDM and CAD systems the task usually involves the direct access and transfer of data between sites. The PDM system will have data storage at more than one site for the large graphics files, file may be copied between sites, how they are synchronized being controlled by the server(s). For the management server and metadata there are a number of options. There could be a single server that is accessed from all locations or multiple PDM servers that communicate with one another. In both cases the PDM software controls access for groups defining what data they can see and edit.

With different CAD systems the approach varies slightly depending on whether the ownership, and therefore authorship, of components changes or not. If geometry only has to be viewed then a product visualization neutral file format (e.g. JT) can be used for tasks such as viewing, markup (redlining) or multi-cad digital mock-up (DMU). It maybe that authorship does not change but components from one group needs to be placed in the assembly of another group so that they can construct their parts, so called work in context. This requires transfer of geometry from one format to another by means of a visualization format or full data translation. Between some systems there is the possibility of ‘data interoperability’ where geometry from one format can be associatively copied to another. If the ownership of a particular file is being transfer, then full data translation is required using some form of CAD data exchange technology. For the translation process product data quality (PDQ) checkers are often employed to reduce problems in transferring the work. If different PDM/EDM systems are in use, then either data structures or metadata can be transferred using STEP or communication between databases can be achieved with tools based around XML data transfer.

== Examples of CPD ==
- GrabCAD Workbench

== See also ==
- Computer-supported collaboration
- Toolkits for user innovation

== Bibliography ==
- Bilgram, V.; Brem, A.; Voigt, K.-I.: User-Centric Innovations in New Product Development; Systematic Identification of Lead User Harnessing Interactive and Collaborative Online-Tools, in: International Journal of Innovation Management, Vol. 12 (2008), No. 3, pp. 419–458.
