= Hicom 300 =

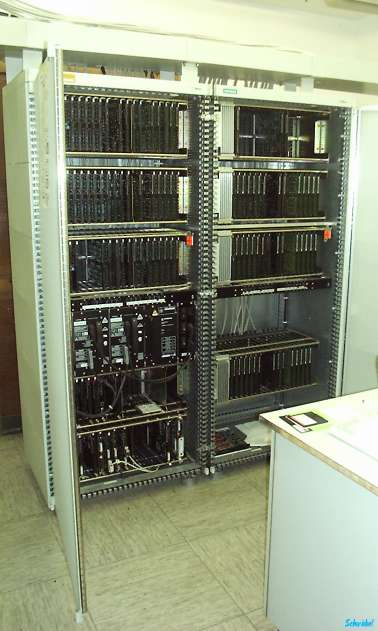
Hicom 300 for approx. 1200 Users

Hicom 300 is a telephone exchange system from Siemens. It was originally sold in the US as the ROLM 9751-9006i, and is used by big companies such as UBS, Swisscom, Nestlé and Tamco. The Hicom system has been surpassed by the HiPath 4000 system (since 2013 Unify OpenScape 4000) (which is in turn being surpassed by Siemens's VoIP offerings). The Hicom/HiPath series are a modular set of phone systems which come in several shapes and sizes, from the smallest wall-mountable units which support a few dozen clients to the largest modular block units which take multiple cards for digital (ISDN), POTS (analog), and VoIP cards. These phones are typically administered via a LAN card with Siemens's phone management software ('Manager E' also known as the 'ASS_150e.exe'), and are extremely powerful. Customer passwords are obscured in the KDS files but may be hacked using simple programs developed by third-party personnel. The HiPath 3000 system can be integrated with a range of Siemens applications which were actually written by other companies and then rebranded.

HICOM 300 uses Siemens developed software (rebranding involved) COMTES or COMWIN to give full access to configure the system. The interface between COMWIN and HICOM can be LAN, serial, or modem. The LAN access uses IP protocol with a built in setting (IP:192.0.2.3 mask:255.255.255.0 and Gateway:192.0.2.4) which must be supported either by the standalone terminal or attached network.
