= JT (visualization format) =

CAD data-exchange format by Siemens

Jupiter Tessellation
- Filename extension: .JT
- Latest release: 10.6; 2024
- Type of format: A scene graph CAD format
- Open format?: Yes
- Website: Siemens JT

JT (Jupiter Tessellation) is an openly-published ISO-standardized 3D CAD data exchange format used for product visualization, collaboration, digital mockups, and other purposes. It was developed by Siemens.

It can contain any combination of approximate (faceted) data, boundary representation surfaces (NURBS), Product and Manufacturing Information (PMI), and Metadata (textual attributes) either exported from the native CAD system or inserted by a product data management (PDM) system.

The JT format contains a scene graph representation of an assembly, nested sub-assemblies of parts with CAD specific node and attributes data. Facet information (triangles) is stored by using geometry compression techniques. Visual attributes of 3D scene and model like lights, textures, and/or materials are supported. Product and Manufacturing Information (PMI), Precise Part definitions (BRep), additional metadata, and a variety of representation configurations are supported. The JT format is designed to be streamable.

== Overview ==
JT files are used in product lifecycle management (PLM) software programs and their respective CAD systems, by engineers and other professionals that need to analyze the geometry of complex products. The format and associated software is structured so that extremely large numbers of components can be quickly loaded, shaded and manipulated in real-time. Because all major 3D CAD formats are supported, a JT assembly can contain a mixture of any combination which has led to the term "multi-CAD". As JT is typically implemented as an integral part of a PLM solution, the resulting multi-CAD assembly is managed such that changes to the original CAD product definition files can be automatically synchronized with their associated JT files resulting in a multi-CAD assembly that is always up-to-date.

Because JT files are inherently "lightweight" (~1-10% of the size of a CAD file) they are ideal for internet collaboration. With the growing trend toward globalization, more companies are leveraging resources wherever they are available in the world. Collaboration using JT allows companies to send 3D visualization data to suppliers and partners much more easily than sending the associated "heavy" CAD files. In addition, real-time, on-line collaboration is easier because the amount of information sent back-and-forth across the internet is reduced. Finally, JT provides an inherent security feature such that intellectual property does not have to be shared with inappropriate parties. As indicated above, JT can contain any combination of data such that the right amount of information can be shared without exposing the underlying proprietary design definition information.

JT is often used for Digital mock-up (DMU) work, which allows engineers to validate that a product can be assembled without interferences long before a physical prototype could be produced. This "spatial validation" is enabled by precise measurements and cross-sectioning as well as sophisticated clearance/interference detection. Leveraging JT for digital mock-up allows users to reduce or eliminate costly physical prototypes and enables decision-making to occur much earlier in the development process.

Finally, JT is used as a CAD interoperability format for exchanging design data for Collaborative Product Development, where JT files are created by translating data from CAD systems such as NX (Unigraphics), Creo Elements/Pro, FORAN, I-DEAS, Solid Edge, Catia, Microstation or Autodesk Inventor.

=== Large model rendering ===
JT was created to support the interactive display of very large assemblies (i.e. those containing tens of thousands of components). The JT file format is capable of storing an arbitrary number of faceted representations with varying levels of detail (LODs). When the whole product is displayed on the computer screen the hosting application displays only a simple, coarse, model. However, as the user zooms into a particular area, progressively finer representations are loaded and displayed. Over time, unused representations are unloaded to save memory.

== History ==
JT was originally developed by Engineering Animation, Inc. and Hewlett-Packard as the DirectModel toolkit (initially Jupiter). JT is the abbreviation for Jupiter Tesselation. When EAI was purchased by UGS Corp., JT became a part of UGS's suite of products. Early in 2007 UGS announced the publication of the JT data format easing the adoption of JT as a master 3D format. Also in 2007, UGS was acquired by Siemens AG and became Siemens Digital Industries Software. JT is the common interoperability format in use across all of Siemens Digital Industries Software and has been adopted as the long term data archival format across all of Siemens.

On September 18, 2009, the ISO stated officially that the JT specification has been accepted for publication as an ISO Publicly Available Specification (PAS). End of August 2010 the Ballot for the New Work Item (NWI) proposal for JT as ISO International Standard was started by ProSTEP iViP. ProSTEP iViP thereby aimed on the one hand to publish the JT file format specification as ISO Standard and, on the other hand, to harmonize this undertaking with the new STEP AP 242 development, so that JT and STEP (especially STEP AP 242 XML) can be used together to assure major benefits within industrial data exchange scenarios.

In 2012 December, JT has been officially published as ISO 14306:2012 (ISO JT V1) as a 3D visualization format, based on version 9.5 of JT specifications released by Siemens Digital Industries Software. Through this publication via ISO, for the first time a completely neutral and royalty-free specification of JT was available.

Beginning of 2013, in ISO the specification of ISO JT V2 was started. The ISO/DIS 14306 V2 was accepted by ISO in November 2016. The final International Standard was published in November 2017. Main difference between V1 and V2 is the incorporation of a STEP B-rep as an additional B-rep segment.

For providing additional functionalities and innovations required by industry, ProSTEP iViP and VDA decided mid of 2015 to specify a so-called JT Industrial Application Package (JTIAP), which is a JT file format specification completely compatible to ISO 14306 (V1 as well as the future V2) and currently existing JT-Open-based implementations. Thereby, JTIAP provide a more comprehensive compression algorithm (LZMA), specifies XT B-rep as recommended representation of exact geometry and allows the neutral and royalty-free implementation of JT.

== Data model ==
The JT data model is capable of representing a wide range of engineering data. This data can be very lightweight, holding little more than facet data or it can be quite rich, containing complete NURBS geometry representations along with product structure, attributes, meta data and PMI. It also supports multiple tessellations and level-of-detail (LOD) generation.

- Product Structure - assembly, part, instance
- Facet - polygon, polygon set
- Lighting - light set, point light, infinite light
- Textures
- Precise Geometry and Topology - point, curve, surface, face, loop, edge, vertex
- Boundary representation (B-rep) could use either JT B-rep and XT B-rep (Parasolid) format, STEP B-rep will be supported by ISO JT V2
- Geometry Primitives - box, cylinder, pyramid, sphere
- Product and Manufacturing Information (PMI) - GD&T, 3D annotations
- Attributes / Properties - text, integer, float, date, layers

== File structure ==
The relationship of product structure hierarchy to exported JT file structure is arbitrary. Any node in the hierarchy may be specified as the start of a new JT file. Thus, product structure may be represented in a variety of JT file configurations.

JT supports common product structure-to-file structure mappings. These include:

- Per part - All assembly nodes in a product structure hierarchy are stored in a single JT file, and each part node in the hierarchy is stored in an individual JT file in a sub-directory that is of the same name as the assembly JT file.
- Fully shattered - Each product structure node in the hierarchy is stored in an individual JT file.
- Monolithic - All product structure is stored in a single JT file.
- PLMXML - An open XML-based file format, specified by Siemens Digital Industries Software. A PLMXML-structure could link to the model data in another file (an External Representation), or the data can be embedded within the Representation element in the XML file (an InternalRepresentation).
- STEP AP 242 XML - An ISO Standard, with allows to represent assembly, meta, kinematic data etc. and to link to the model data as external references (leaves on a STEP-tree). In global automotive industry, for realizing cross-company data exchange scenarios the application of STEP AP 242 XML and JT is recommended.

Client applications may use these mappings, or choose to define their own custom mapping.

== Compression ==
To help shrink the storage and transmission bandwidth requirements of 3D models, JT files may take advantage of compression. Use of compression is transparent to the user of the JT data, and a given model may be composed of JT files using different compression settings (including none).

To date, the JT file format has evolved through two forms of compression, exposed in JT Open Toolkit as standard and advanced compression. These differ in that the former employs a simple, lossless compression algorithm, while the latter employs a more sophisticated, domain-specific compression scheme supporting lossy geometry compression. Client applications are encouraged to take advantage of advanced compression over standard compression, as attainable compression ratios are much greater. Support for standard compression is maintained only in the interest of backward compatibility with legacy JT file viewing applications.

The compression form used by a JT file is related to the JT file format version in which it was written. This version is readily viewable by opening a JT file in a text editor and looking at its ASCII header information.

== See also ==
- Open Packaging Conventions
