= UGS Corp. =

American computer software company

UGS Corporation

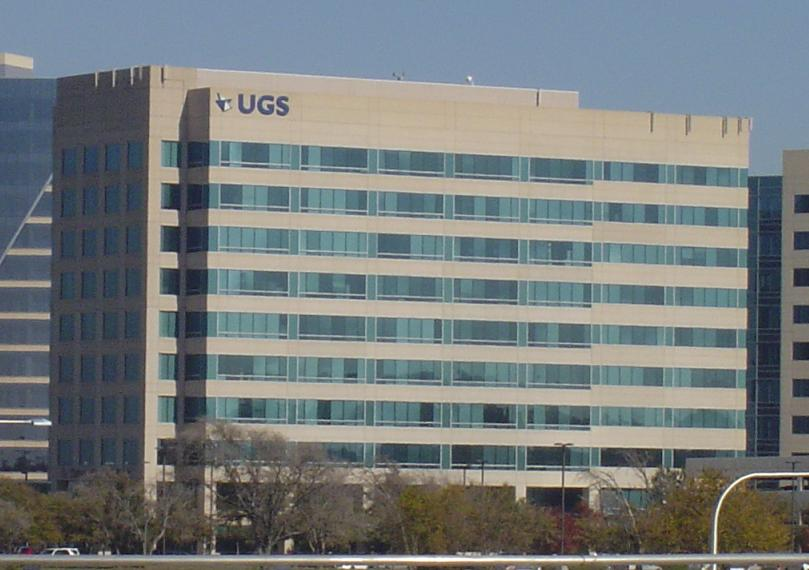
- Headquarters in Plano, Texas
- Industry: Aerospace/Defense; Automotive and Transportation; Electronics and telecommunications Fabrication and assembly
- Founded: 1963, Torrance, California
- Defunct: 2007
- Fate: Purchased and integrated into Siemens Industry Automation division of Siemens AG
- Successor: Siemens Digital Industries Software
- Headquarters: Plano, Texas
- Key people: Tony Affuso, Chuck Grindstaff, John Graham, David Shirk
- Products: PLM software and services — Teamcenter, NX, Tecnomatix, UGS Velocity Series
- Number of employees: 7300 (February 2007)
- Parent: McDonnell Douglas (1976 - 1991); EDS (1991 - 2004); UGS Corp. (2004 - 2007); Siemens AG (2007 - present)

UGS was a computer software company headquartered in Plano, Texas, specializing in 3D & 2D Product Lifecycle Management (PLM) software. Its operations were amalgamated into the Siemens Digital Industries Software business unit of Siemens Industry Automation division, when Siemens completed the US$3.5 billion acquisition of UGS on May 7, 2007.

UGS' flagship products were NX, a CAD/CAM/CAE commercial software suite, and Teamcenter, an integrated set of PLM and collaboration (cPD) tools. The company's portfolio also contained NX I-deas, NX Nastran, Solid Edge, Imageware, Tecnomatix, Jack, SDK, Femap, D-Cubed, JT, PLM Vis, PLM XML, and Parasolid.

== History ==
=== Inception as United Computing: 1963 to 1975 ===
The first commercial product developed by UGS was called UNIAPT. Released in 1969 by a software company then called United Computing, UNIAPT was one of the world's first end-user CAM products. United Computing was founded in 1963 above a hair salon in Torrance, California, and went on to purchase the Automated Drafting and Machining (ADAM) software code from MGS in 1973. The code became a foundation for a product called UNI-GRAPHICS, later sold commercially as Unigraphics in 1975.

=== As a McDonnell Douglas company: 1976 to 1991 ===
In 1976, United Computing was acquired by the Aerospace company McDonnell Douglas (now part of Boeing), who created new CAD/CAM divisions, naming one the Unigraphics Group. Finally, in 1980, Unigraphics was released, marking the group's first true 3D modeling hardware and software offering.

Already home to McDonnell Douglas, the Unigraphics Group grew in St. Louis, Missouri, which became the new headquarters.

=== EDS: 1991 to 2004 ===
In 1991, the McDonnell Douglas Systems Integration groups, including Unigraphics, were acquired by EDS (then a part of General Motors Corp., later part of HP Enterprise Services and now DXC Technology). EDS branded the acquired business as EDS Unigraphics. Eventually, in 1997 EDS set up its Unigraphics division as a wholly owned subsidiary called Unigraphics Solutions. EDS took Unigraphics Solutions public while continuing to own majority controlling shares in Unigraphics. During this time, Unigraphics acquired a few companies itself including Engineering Animation, Inc., the former Ames, Iowa-based visualization company.

In 1999 the company acquired Applicon, a long term player in the EDA field.

In 2001, the company was renamed to UGS. EDS repurchased all outstanding stock and acquired SDRC - a former competitor of Unigraphics - and merged both into a single Line of Business (LOB) named EDS PLM Solutions.

=== UGS Corporation: 2004 to 2007 ===
In 2004 EDS sold off its EDS PLM Solutions business to the private equity group of Bain Capital, Silver Lake Partners, and Warburg Pincus. The company resumed operating under the UGS name following the private equity sale.

In 2005, UGS purchased Tecnomatix Technologies Ltd.

=== Acquisition by Siemens: 2007 ===
On January 24, 2007, the German electronics giant Siemens AG announced the acquisition of UGS for US$3.5 billion; and after completion of the deal, UGS became part of Siemens Automation & Drives group as the UGS PLM Software division before being renamed to Siemens Digital Industries Software.
