= ASDF =

ASDF may refer to:

== Military ==
- Air Self-Defense Force, in Japan
- Alabama State Defense Force, a military entity
- Alaska State Defense Force, a military entity

== Technology ==
- Advanced Scientific Data Format, a form of storing astronomical data
- Another System Definition Facility, a build system for Common Lisp
- ASDF, the sequence of letters from the left end of the home row on certain keyboard layouts

== See also ==
- asdfmovie, an animated sketch comedy series on YouTube
