= Common Data Format =

Library and toolkit for multi-dimensional data

Common Data Format (CDF) is a library and toolkit that was developed by the National Space Science Data Center (NSSDC) at NASA started in 1985. The software is an interface for the storage and manipulation of multi-dimensional data sets.

== See also ==
- CGNS (CFD General Notation System)
- Common data model
- EAS3 (Ein-Ausgabe-System)
- FITS (Flexible Image Transport System)
- GRIB (GRIdded Binary)
- Hierarchical Data Format (HDF)
- NetCDF (Network Common Data Form - not compatible with CDF)
- Tecplot binary files
- XMDF (eXtensible Model Data Format)
