= Aperture Photometry Tool =

APT

Aperture Photometry Tool (APT)
- Motto: Inviso notitia ("Look at the data!")
- Developer: Russ Laher (IPAC)
- Initial release: 2007; 19 years ago
- Stable release: v. 3.1.3 / 17 November 2026; 1 day ago
- Development status: Active
- Programming language: Java
- Platforms: Windows, Linux, and Mac OS
- Type: Astronomy
- License: Free software for research & education
- Website: www.aperturephotometry.org

Aperture Photometry Tool (APT) is software with a graphical user interface for computing aperture photometry on astronomical imagery. Image overlays, graphical representations, statistics, models, options and controls for aperture-photometry calculations are brought together into a single package. The software handles images in FITS and ASDF file formats. The software also can be used as a FITS/ASDF-image viewer. APT is executed on desktop and laptop computers, and is free of charge under a license that limits its use to astronomical research and education. The software may be downloaded from its official website, and requires the Java Virtual Machine to be installed on the user's computer.

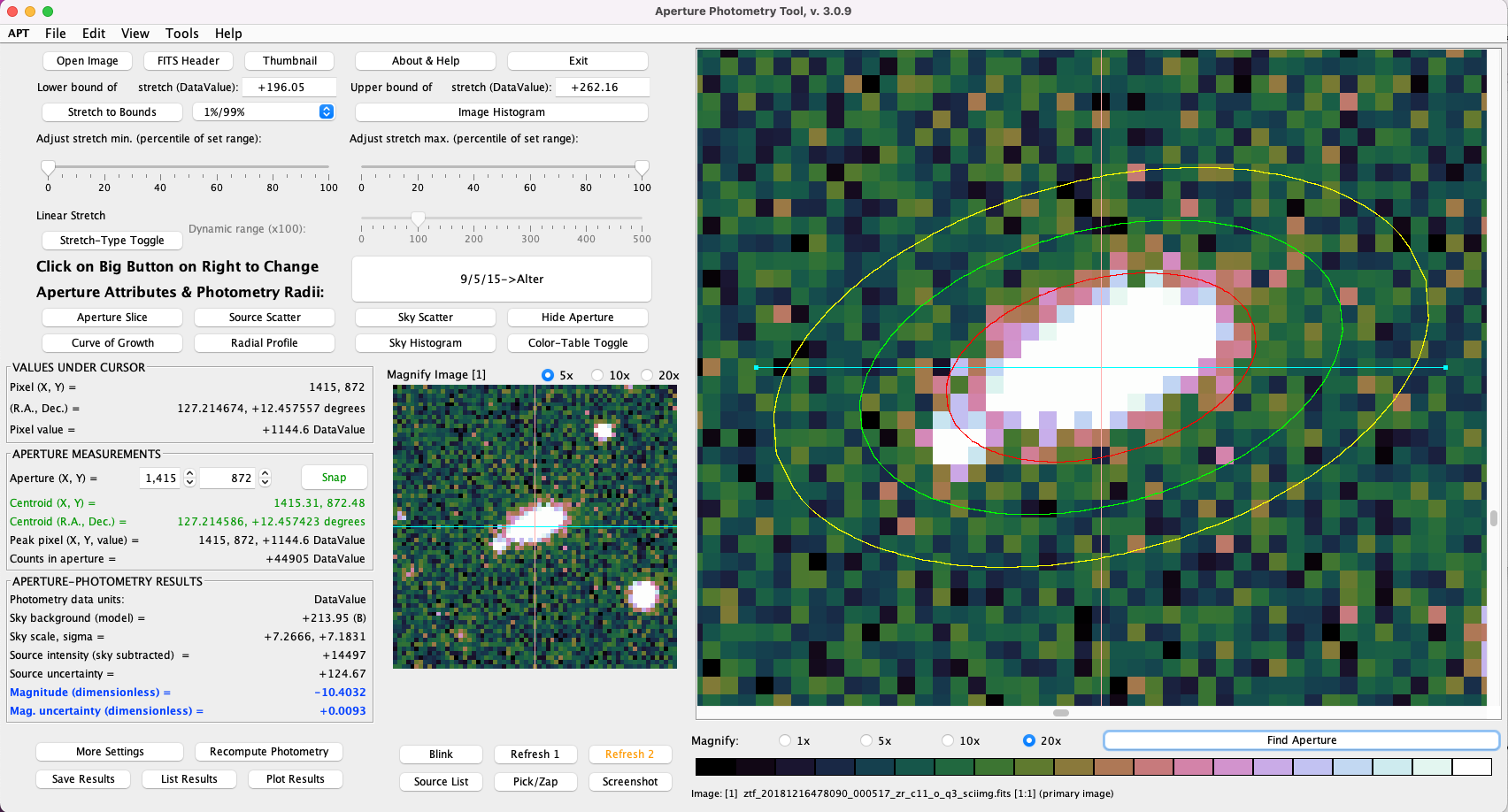
APT's main graphical user interface

APT runs locally, on the user’s machine. It does not require an Internet connection, nor does it use one. The FITS/ASDF image files that are input to APT must be available on the user’s machine.

== History ==
The initial version of APT was released on November 2, 2007. The latest version is APT v. 3.1.3, released on November 17, 2026. The software was developed by Dr. Russ Laher, a member of the professional staff at the NASA Exoplanet Science Institute (NExScI), part of the Infrared Processing and Analysis Center (IPAC) at the California Institute of Technology. A paper on APT was published in July 2012 in the journal Publications of the Astronomy Society of the Pacific. A companion paper compares the performance of APT vs. SExtractor, an established command-line software program for aperture photometry.

== Aperture and Sky Annulus ==
Aperture geometry, size, and location in the image are important parameters in aperture photometry. APT allows circular and elliptical shapes for apertures and sky annuli (the latter are used for background estimation). The rotation can be controlled in the case of an ellipse. The sky annulus will have the same shape as the aperture, but with larger inner and outer radii than the aperture. Although there is no hard limitation on the aperture size, it is practically limited by the software's response time in the calculation for a large aperture and sky annulus, and the tool for the user to interactively specify the size parameters includes a discretely zoomable subimage that is 801x801 pixels. The aperture is placed on the desired image location with a mouse click. Options to allow minor adjustments of the aperture position via centroiding are available. APT also has pixel-zapping functionality, which can be used to temporarily set the value of select pixels to NaN (not a number), effectively removing them from the aperture-photometry calculations.

== Sky Coordinates ==
For aperture photometry on an astronomical image, it is often useful to know the sky coordinates of an image pixel. APT computes and displays sky coordinates if keywords that define a World Coordinate System (WCS) are present in the header of the FITS-image file or if a gwcs object is present in the ASDF-image file. APT handles the commonly used tangent or gnomonic projection (TAN, TPV, and SIP subtypes), as well as the sine (a.k.a. orthographic), Cartesian, Plate carrée, Aitoff, and Zenithal/Azimuthal projections.

APT calculates geometric image distortion only for the tangent projection at this time. Two distortion conventions are supported, which are the two major methods employed in modern astronomy. The SIP convention is applied for images with CTYPE1 = 'RA---TAN-SIP' and CTYPE2 = 'DEC—TAN-SIP'. In the absence of SIP keywords, APT will attempt to read in and apply any PV distortion keywords in the FITS header for images with either CTYPE1 = 'RA---TAN' and CTYPE2 = 'DEC—TAN' or with CTYPE1 = 'RA---TPV' and CTYPE2 = 'DEC—TPV'. APT computes SIP distortion up to ninth polynomial order and PV distortion up to seventh polynomial order.

APT includes modifications to ensure correct sky-to-pixel coordinates are computed for SIP distortion when the inverse polynomial coefficients are missing.

For Roman WFI ASDF files, APT evaluates the whole gwcs pixel by pixel and fits a TAN-SIP header to it. The tangent point is the sky position at the image center. The WFI's field is small, so TAN plus SIP polynomials fits the true mapping closely. The tests gave ≤ 3.6e-7 px forward and ≤ 8.2e-5 px inverse on the six Roman files that were tested.

APT Projections Table
CTYPE1 / CTYPE2	Projection	Distortion
RA---TAN / DEC--TAN	Gnomonic/Tangent	PV1_0…PV2_39, used if present (TPV-style)
RA---TPV / DEC--TPV	Gnomonic/Tangent	PV polynomial (TPV)
RA---TAN-SIP / DEC--TAN-SIP	Gnomonic/Tangent	SIP A/B; AP/BP if present, otherwise it iterates
RA---SIN / DEC--SIN	Orthographic	None
RA---CAR / DEC--CAR	Plate carrée	None
RA---AIT / DEC--AIT	Hammer-Aitoff	None
RA---ZPN / DEC--ZPN	Zenithal/Azimuthal	PV2_0…PV2_29 radial terms
RA---ZPN-SIP / DEC--ZPN-SIP	Zenithal/Azimuthal	SIP (plain ZPN if there is no A_ORDER)

== Aperture-Photometry Results ==
Simply mouse-clicking on a source in the displayed image will initiate the computation of aperture-photomety results. Several useful quantities are computed, the most important being background-subtracted source intensity. The source-intensity uncertainty, sky background, sky-background uncertainty, magnitude, and magnitude uncertainty are also notable aggregate results. The magnitude quantities will pertain to instrumental magnitude, not absolute magnitude, unless a calibration zero point is provided.

== Java requirements ==
APT is written in the Java programming language. The latest APT version was built with the JDK 13.0.2 on a Nov 2023 MacBook Pro laptop under macOS Tahoe, Version 26.6.2 (and using apache-ant-1.10.15). Generally, APT can be executed with JRE versions greater than or equal to 13.0.2, since Java is "forward-compatible". APT can be executed by clicking or double-clicking on the APT icon in the case of Apple and Windows machines. The wrapper script APT.csh can be executed from a terminal window to start APT running from any machine, including those with Linux-type or Unix-type operating systems.
