= ADCIRC =

Numerical ocean circulation model

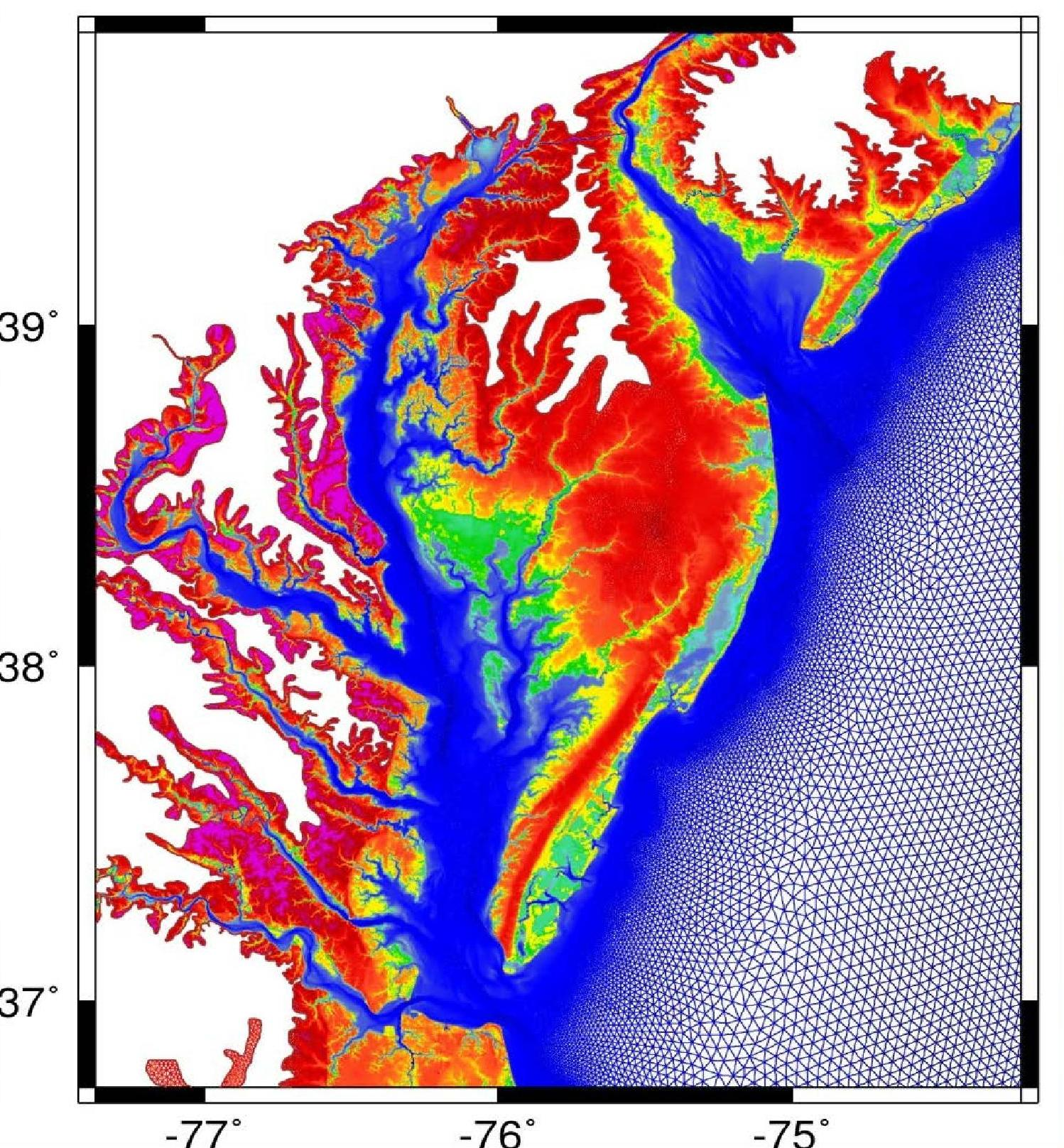
ADCIRC mesh in the Chesapeake Bay area used for the FEMA Coastal Storm Surge Study

The ADCIRC model is a high-performance, cross-platform numerical ocean circulation model popular in simulating storm surge, tides, and coastal circulation problems. Originally developed by Drs. Rick Luettich and Joannes Westerink, the model is developed and maintained by a combination of academic, governmental, and corporate partners, including the University of North Carolina at Chapel Hill, the University of Notre Dame, the University of Texas at Austin, University of Oklahoma, North Carolina State University, University of Georgia, and the US Army Corps of Engineers. The ADCIRC system includes an independent multi-algorithmic wind forecast model and also has advanced coupling capabilities, allowing it to integrate effects from sediment transport, ice, waves, surface runoff, and baroclinicity.

== Access ==
The model is free, with source code made available by request via the website, allowing users to run the model on any system with a Fortran compiler. A pre-compiled Windows version of the model can also be purchased alongside the SMS software. ADCIRC is coded in Fortran, and can be used with native binary, text, or netCDF file formats.

== Capabilities ==
The model formulation is based on the shallow water equations, solving the continuity equation (represented in the form of the Generalized Wave Continuity Equation) and the momentum equations (with advective, Coriolis, eddy viscosity, and surface stress terms included). ADCIRC utilizes the finite element method in either three-dimensional or two-dimensional depth-integrated form on a triangular unstructured grid with Cartesian or spherical coordinates. It can run in either barotropic or baroclinic modes, allowing inclusion of changes in water density and properties such as salinity and temperature. ADCIRC can be run either in serial mode (e.g. on a personal computer) or in parallel on supercomputers via MPI. The model has been optimized to be highly parallelized, in order to facilitate rapid computation of large, complex problems.

ADCIRC is able to apply several different bottom friction formulations including Manning's n-based bottom drag due to changes in land coverage (such as forests, cities, and seafloor composition), as well as utilize atmospheric forcing data (wind stress and atmospheric pressure) from several sources, and further reduce the strength of the wind forcing due to surface roughness effects. The model is also able to incorporate effects such as time-varying topography and bathymetry, boundary fluxes from rivers or other sources, tidal potential, and sub-grid scale features like levees.

ADCIRC is frequently coupled to a wind wave model such as STWAVE, SWAN, or WAVEWATCH III, especially in storm surge applications where wave radiation stress can have important effects on ocean circulation and vice versa. In these applications, the model is able to take advantage of tight coupling with wave models to increase calculation accuracy.

== See also ==
- List of computational fluid dynamics software
