= HDF Explorer =

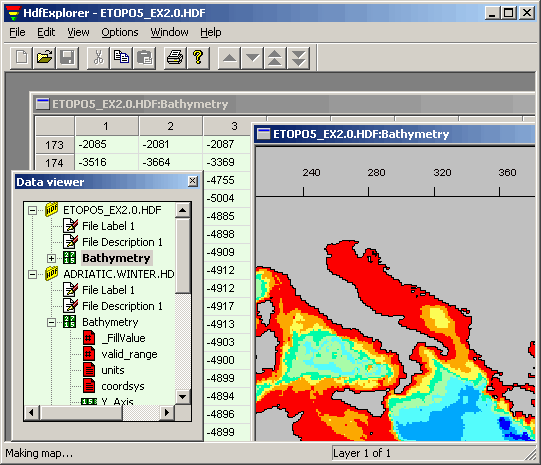
- Typical view of HDF Explorer
- Initial release: 1998
- Stable release: 1.5.009 / October 08, 2015
- Operating system: Windows
- Website: https://web.archive.org/web/20250708191516/https://www.space-research.org/

HDF Explorer is a data visualization program that reads the HDF, HDF5 and netCDF data file formats. It runs in the Microsoft Windows operating systems. HDF Explorer was developed by Space Research Software, LLC, headquartered in Urbana-Champaign, Illinois.
