= Photometry (astronomy) =

Determination of light intensities of astronomical bodies

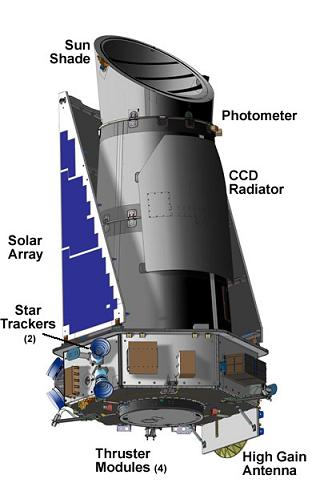
Kepler Mission space photometer

In astronomy, photometry, from Greek photo- ("light") and -metry ("measure"), is a technique used in astronomy that is concerned with measuring the flux or intensity of light radiated by astronomical objects. This light is measured through a telescope using a photometer, often made using electronic devices such as a CCD photometer or a photoelectric photometer that converts light into an electric current by the photoelectric effect. When calibrated against standard stars (or other light sources) of known intensity and colour, photometers can measure the brightness or apparent magnitude of celestial objects.

The methods used to perform photometry depend on the wavelength region under study. At its most basic, photometry is conducted by gathering light and passing it through specialized photometric optical bandpass filters, and then capturing and recording the light energy with a photosensitive instrument. Standard sets of passbands (called a photometric system) are defined to allow accurate comparison of observations. A more advanced technique is spectrophotometry that is measured with a spectrophotometer and observes both the amount of radiation and its detailed spectral distribution.

Photometry is also used in the observation of variable stars, by various techniques such as, differential photometry that simultaneously measures the brightness of a target object and nearby stars in the starfield or relative photometry by comparing the brightness of the target object to stars with known fixed magnitudes. Using multiple bandpass filters with relative photometry is termed absolute photometry. A plot of magnitude against time produces a light curve, yielding considerable information about the physical process causing the brightness changes. Precision photoelectric photometers can measure starlight around 0.001 magnitude.

The technique of surface photometry can also be used with extended objects like planets, comets, nebulae or galaxies that measures the apparent magnitude in terms of magnitudes per square arcsecond. Knowing the area of the object and the average intensity of light across the astronomical object determines the surface brightness in terms of magnitudes per square arcsecond, while integrating the total light of the extended object can then calculate brightness in terms of its total magnitude, energy output or luminosity per unit surface area.

== Methods ==
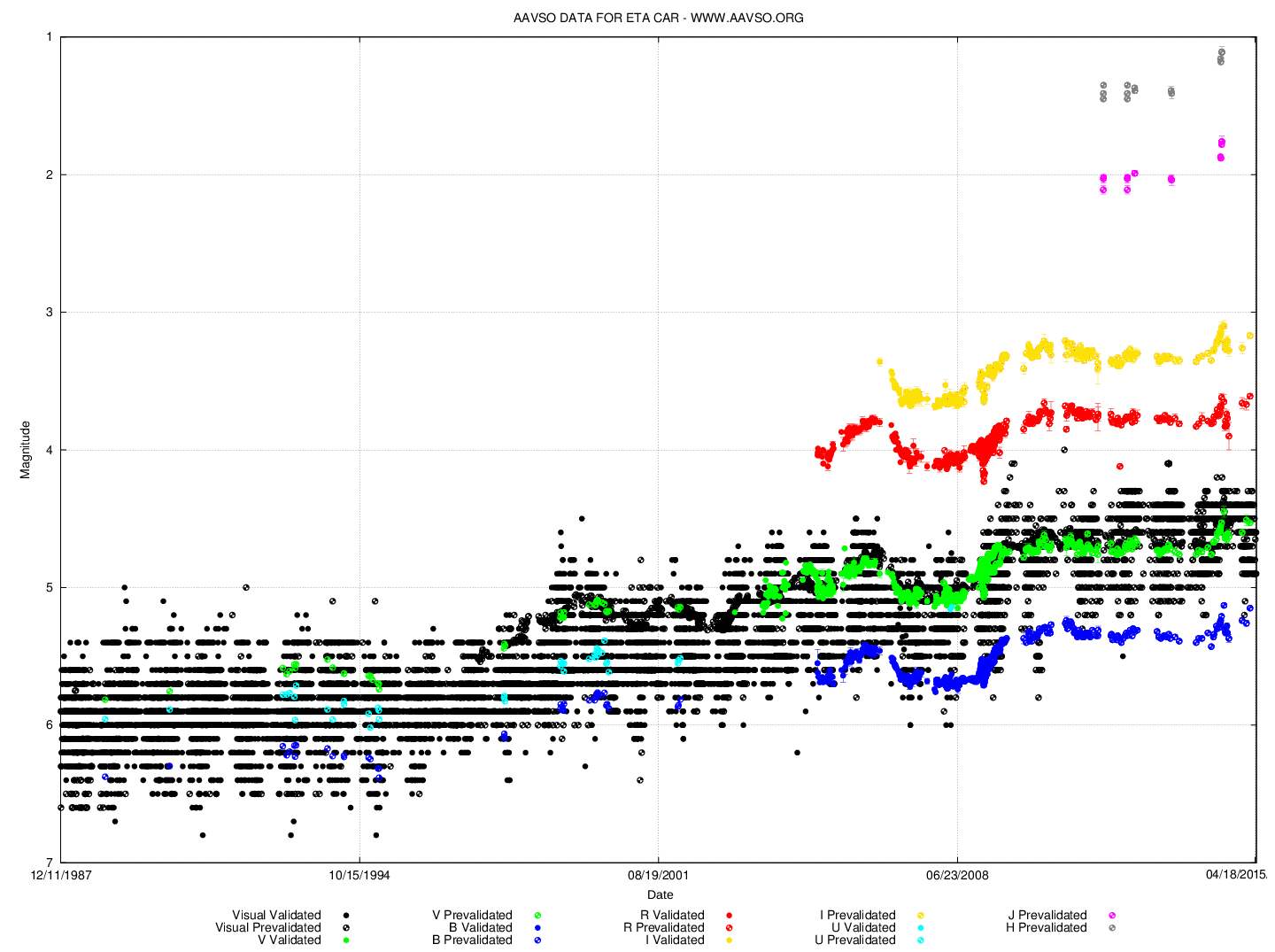
Eta Carinae light curve in several different passbands

Astronomy was among the earliest applications of photometry. Modern photometers use specialised standard passband filters across the ultraviolet, visible, and infrared wavelengths of the electromagnetic spectrum. Any adopted set of filters with known light transmission properties is called a photometric system, and allows the establishment of particular properties about stars and other types of astronomical objects. Several important systems are regularly used, such as the UBV system (or the extended UBVRI system), near infrared JHK or the Strömgren uvbyβ system.

Historically, photometry in the near-infrared through short-wavelength ultra-violet was done with a photoelectric photometer, an instrument that measured the light intensity of a single object by directing its light onto a photosensitive cell like a photomultiplier tube. These have largely been replaced with CCD cameras that can simultaneously image multiple objects, although photoelectric photometers are still used in special situations, such as where fine time resolution is required.

== Magnitudes and colour indices ==
Modern photometric methods define magnitudes and colours of astronomical objects using electronic photometers viewed through standard coloured bandpass filters. This differs from other expressions of apparent visual magnitude observed by the human eye or obtained by photography: that usually appear in older astronomical texts and catalogues.

Magnitudes measured by photometers in some commonplace photometric systems (UBV, UBVRI or JHK) are expressed with a capital letter, such as "V" (m_{V}) or "B" (m_{B}). Other magnitudes estimated by the human eye are expressed using lower case letters, such as "v", "b" or "p", etc. E.g. Visual magnitudes as m_{v}, while photographic magnitudes are m_{ph} / m_{p} or photovisual magnitudes m_{p} or m_{pv}. Hence, a 6th magnitude star might be stated as 6.0V, 6.0B, 6.0v or 6.0p. Because starlight is measured over a different range of wavelengths across the electromagnetic spectrum and are affected by different instrumental photometric sensitivities to light, they are not necessarily equivalent in numerical value. For example, apparent magnitude in the UBV system for the solar-like star 51 Pegasi is 5.46V, 6.16B or 6.39U, corresponding to magnitudes observed through each of the visual 'V', blue 'B' or ultraviolet 'U' filters.

Magnitude differences between filters indicate colour differences and are related to temperature. Using B and V filters in the UBV system produces the B–V colour index. For 51 Pegasi, the B–V = 6.16 – 5.46 = +0.70, suggesting a yellow coloured star that agrees with its G2IV spectral type. Knowing the B–V results determines the star's surface temperature, finding an effective surface temperature of 5768±8 K.

Another important application of colour indices is graphically plotting star's apparent magnitude against the B–V colour index. This forms the important relationships found between sets of stars in colour–magnitude diagrams, which for stars is the observed version of the Hertzsprung–Russell diagram. Typically photometric measurements of multiple objects obtained through two filters will show, for example in an open cluster, the comparative stellar evolution between the component stars or to determine the cluster's relative age.

Due to the large number of different photometric systems adopted by astronomers, there are many expressions of magnitudes and their indices. Each of these newer photometric systems, excluding UBV, UBVRI or JHK systems, assigns an upper or lower case letter to the filter used. For example, magnitudes used by Gaia are 'G' (with the blue and red photometric filters, G_{BP} and G_{RP}) or the Strömgren photometric system having lower case letters of 'u', 'v', 'b', 'y', and two narrow and wide 'β' (Hydrogen-beta) filters. Some photometric systems also have certain advantages. For example, Strömgren photometry can be used to measure the effects of reddening and interstellar extinction. Strömgren allows calculation of parameters from the b and y filters (colour index of b − y) without the effects of reddening, as the indices m _{1} and c _{1}.

== Applications ==
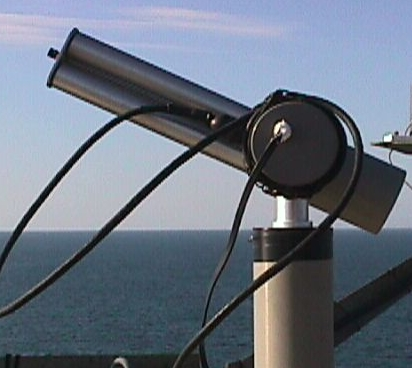
AERONET photometer

There are many astronomical applications used with photometric systems. Photometric measurements can be combined with the inverse-square law to determine the luminosity of an object if its distance can be determined, or its distance if its luminosity is known. Other physical properties of an object, such as its temperature or chemical composition, may also be determined via broad or narrow-band spectrophotometry.

Photometry is also used to study the light variations of objects such as variable stars, minor planets, active galactic nuclei and supernovae, or to detect transiting extrasolar planets. Measurements of these variations can be used, for example, to determine the orbital period and the radii of the members of an eclipsing binary star system, the rotation period of a minor planet or a star, or the total energy output of supernovae.

== CCD photometry ==
A CCD (charge-coupled device) camera is essentially a grid of photometers, simultaneously measuring and recording the photons coming from all the sources in the field of view. Because each CCD image records the photometry of multiple objects at once, various forms of photometric extraction can be performed on the recorded data; typically relative, absolute, and differential. All three will require the extraction of the raw image magnitude of the target object, and a known comparison object. The observed signal from an object will typically cover many pixels according to the point spread function (PSF) of the system. This broadening is due to both the optics in the telescope and the astronomical seeing. When obtaining photometry from a point source, the flux is measured by summing all the light recorded from the object and subtracting the light due to the sky. The simplest technique, known as aperture photometry, consists of summing the pixel counts within an aperture centered on the object and subtracting the product of the nearby average sky count per pixel and the number of pixels within the aperture. This will result in the raw flux value of the target object. When doing photometry in a very crowded field, such as a globular cluster, where the profiles of stars overlap significantly, one must use de-blending techniques, such as PSF fitting to determine the individual flux values of the overlapping sources.

=== Calibrations ===
After determining the flux of an object in counts, the flux is normally converted into instrumental magnitude. Then, the measurement is calibrated in some way. Which calibrations are used will depend in part on what type of photometry is being done. Typically, observations are processed for relative or differential photometry. Relative photometry is the measurement of the apparent brightness of multiple objects relative to each other. Absolute photometry is the measurement of the apparent brightness of an object on a standard photometric system; these measurements can be compared with other absolute photometric measurements obtained with different telescopes or instruments. Differential photometry is the measurement of the difference in brightness of two objects. In most cases, differential photometry can be done with the highest precision, while absolute photometry is the most difficult to do with high precision. Also, accurate photometry is usually more difficult when the apparent brightness of the object is fainter.

=== Absolute photometry ===
To perform absolute photometry one must correct for differences between the effective passband through which an object is observed and the passband used to define the standard photometric system. This is often in addition to all of the other corrections discussed above. Typically this correction is done by observing the object(s) of interest through multiple filters and also observing a number of photometric standard stars. If the standard stars cannot be observed simultaneously with the target(s), this correction must be done under photometric conditions, when the sky is cloudless and the extinction is a simple function of the airmass.

=== Relative photometry ===
To perform relative photometry, one compares the instrument magnitude of the object to a known comparison object, and then corrects the measurements for spatial variations in the sensitivity of the instrument and the atmospheric extinction. This is often in addition to correcting for their temporal variations, particularly when the objects being compared are too far apart on the sky to be observed simultaneously. When doing the calibration from an image that contains both the target and comparison objects in close proximity, and using a photometric filter that matches the catalog magnitude of the comparison object most of the measurement variations decrease to null.

=== Differential photometry ===
Differential photometry is the simplest of the calibrations and most useful for time series observations. When using CCD photometry, both the target and comparison objects are observed at the same time, with the same filters, using the same instrument, and viewed through the same optical path. Most of the observational variables drop out and the differential magnitude is simply the difference between the instrument magnitude of the target object and the comparison object (∆Mag = C Mag – T Mag). This is very useful when plotting the change in magnitude over time of a target object, and is usually compiled into a light curve.

=== Surface photometry ===
For spatially extended objects such as galaxies, it is often of interest to measure the spatial distribution of brightness within the galaxy rather than simply measuring the galaxy's total brightness. An object's surface brightness is its brightness per unit solid angle as seen in projection on the sky, and measurement of surface brightness is known as surface photometry. A common application would be measurement of a galaxy's surface brightness profile, meaning its surface brightness as a function of distance from the galaxy's center. For small solid angles, a useful unit of solid angle is the square arcsecond, and surface brightness is often expressed in magnitudes per square arcsecond. The diameter of galaxies are often defined by the size of the 25th magnitude isophote in the blue B-band.

=== Forced photometry ===
In forced photometry, measurements are conducted at a specified location rather than for a specified object. It is "forced" in the sense that a measurement can be taken even if there is no object visible (in the spectral band of interest) in the location being observed. Forced photometry allows extracting a magnitude, or an upper limit for the magnitude, at a chosen sky location.

== Software ==
A number of free computer programs are available for synthetic aperture photometry and PSF-fitting photometry.

SExtractor and Aperture Photometry Tool are popular examples for aperture photometry. The former is geared towards reduction of large scale galaxy-survey data, and the latter has a graphical user interface (GUI) suitable for studying individual images. DAOPHOT is recognized as the best software for PSF-fitting photometry.

In addition, Photutils, a package of the Astropy project, offers tools for both aperture and PSF-fitting photometry.

== Organizations ==
There are a number of organizations, from professional to amateur, that gather and share photometric data and make it available on-line. Some sites gather the data primarily as a resource for other researchers (ex. AAVSO) and some solicit contributions of data for their own research (ex. CBA):

- American Association of Variable Star Observers (AAVSO).
- Astronomyonline.org
- Center for Backyard Astrophysics (CBA).

== See also ==
- Albedo
- Aperture Photometry Tool - Software
- Bidirectional reflectance distribution function
- Hapke parameters
- Radiometry
- Redshift survey
- Spectroscopy
