= Climat =

Climat, CLIMAT or climat may refer to:

- CLIMAT, a code for reporting climatological data
- Lieu-dit, a French wine term
- climat, the French word for climate
