= NCAP (disambiguation) =

The New Car Assessment Program is a government car safety program.

NCAP may also refer to:

- National Collection of Aerial Photography (NCAP)
- The NetCDF Arithmetic Processor, one of the NetCDF Operators
- Nation's Capital Swim Club
- No Contact Apprehension Policy
