= SMS (hydrology software) =

- Developer(s): Aquaveo
- Stable release: 13.3 / September 2023; 2 years ago
- Operating system: Windows
- Type: Surface water modeling software
- License: Proprietary
- Website: Official website

WMS

- WMS 10.1 screenshot
- Developer(s): Aquaveo
- Stable release: 11.2 / May 2023; 2 years ago
- Operating system: Windows XP and later
- Platform: x86, x64
- Size: 1.1 GB
- Type: Surface-water hydrology software
- License: Proprietary
- Website: Official website

SMS (Surface-water Modeling System) is a complete program for building and simulating surface water models from Aquaveo. It features 1D and 2D modeling and a unique conceptual model approach. Currently supported models include ADCIRC, CMS-FLOW2D, FESWMS, TABS, TUFLOW, BOUSS-2D, CGWAVE, STWAVE, CMS-WAVE (WABED), GENESIS, PTM, and WAM.

Version 9.2 introduced the use of XMDF (eXtensible Model Data Format), which is a compatible extension of HDF5. XMDF files are smaller and allow faster access times than ASCII files.

The Watershed Modeling System (WMS) is a proprietary water modeling software application used to develop watershed computer simulations. The software provides tools to automate various basic and advanced delineations, calculations, and modeling processes. It supports river hydraulic and storm drain models, lumped parameter, regression, 2D hydrologic modeling of watersheds, and can be used to model both water quantity and water quality. As of January 2017, supported models include HEC-1, HEC-RAS, HEC-HMS, TR-20, TR-55, NFF, Rational, MODRAT, HSPF, CE-QUAL-W2, GSSHA, SMPDBK, and other models.

== History ==
SMS was initially developed by the Engineering Computer Graphics Laboratory at Brigham Young University (later renamed in September, 1998 to Environmental Modeling Research Laboratory or EMRL) in the late 1980s on Unix workstations. The development of SMS was funded primarily by The United States Army Corps of Engineers and is still known as the Department of Defense Surface-water Modeling System or DoD SMS. It was later ported to Windows platforms in the mid 1990s and support for HP-UX, IRIX, OSF/1, and Solaris platforms was discontinued.

In April 2007, the main software development team at EMRL entered private enterprise as Aquaveo LLC, and continue to develop SMS and other software products, such as WMS (Watershed Modeling System) and GMS (Groundwater Modeling System).

WMS was initially developed by the Engineering Computer Graphics Laboratory at Brigham Young University in the early 1990s on Unix workstations. James Nelson, Norman Jones, and Woodruff Miller wrote a 1992 paper titled "Algorithm for Precise Drainage-Basin Delineation" that was published in the March 1994 issue of the Journal of Hydraulic Engineering. The paper described an algorithm that could be used to describe the flow of water in a drainage basin, thereby defining the drainage basin.

The development of WMS was funded primarily by The United States Army Corps of Engineers (COE). In 1997, WMS was used by the COE to model runoff in the Sava River basin in Bosnia. The software was sold commercially by Environmental Modeling Systems.

It was later ported to Windows platforms in the mid 1990s. WMS 6.0 (2000) was the last supported version for HP-UX, IRIX, OSF/1, and Solaris platforms. Development of WMS was done by the Environmental Modeling Research Laboratory (EMRL) at Brigham Young University (BYU) until April 2007, when the main software development team at EMRL incorporated as Aquaveo. Royalties from the software are paid to the engineering department at BYU.

The planners of the 2002 Winter Olympics, held in Salt Lake City, Utah, used WMS software to simulate terrorist attacks on water infrastructure such as the Jordanelle Reservoir.

== Examples of SMS Implementation ==
- SMS modeling was used to "determine flooded areas in case of failure or revision of a weir in combination with a coincidental 100-year flood event" (Gerstner, Belzner, and Thorenz, p. 975). Furthermore, "concerning the water level calculations in case of failure of a weir, the Bavarian Environmental Agency provided the Federal Waterways Engineering and Research Institute with those two-dimensional depth-averaged hydrodynamic models, which are covering the whole Bavarian part of the river Main. The models were created with the software Surface-Modeling System (SMS) of Aquaveo LLC" (Gerstner, Belzner, and Thorenz, 976).
- This article "describes the mathematical formulation, numerical implementation, and input specifications of rubble mound structures in the Coastal Modeling System (CMS) operated through the Surface-water Modeling System (SMS)" (Li et al., 1). Describing the input specifications, the authors write, "Working with the SMS interface, users can specify rubble mound structures in the CMS by creating datasets for different structure parameters. Five datasets are required for this application" (Li et al., p. 3) and "users should refer to Aquaveo (2010) for generating a XMDF dataset (*.h5 file) under the SMS" (Li et al., p. 5).
- This study examined the "need of developing mathematical models for determining and predicting water quality of 'river-type' systems. It presents a case study for determining the pollutant dispersion for a section of the River Prut, Ungheni town, which was filled with polluted water with oil products from its tributary river Delia" (Marusic and Ciufudean, p. 177). "The obtained numerical models were developed using the program Surface-water Modeling System (SMS) v.10.1.11, which was designed by experts from Aquaveo company. The hydrodynamics of the studied sector, obtained using the SMS module named RMA2 [13], served as input for the RMA module 4, which determined the pollutant dispersion" (Marusic and Ciufudean, p. 178–179).
- This study focused on finding "recommendations for optimization" of the "Chusovskoy water intake located in the confluence zone of two rivers with essentially different hydrochemical regimes and in the backwater zone of the Kamskaya hydroelectric power station" (Lyubimova et al., p. 1). "A two-dimensional (in a horizontal plane) model for the examined region of the water storage basin was constructed by making use of the software product SMS v.10 of the American company AQUAVEO LLC" (Lyubimova et al., p. 2). Evaluations of the SMS-derived, two-dimensional model as well as a three-dimensional model yielded the discovery that "the selective water intake from the near-surface layers can essentially reduce hardness of potable water consumed by the inhabitants of Perm" (Lyubimova et al., p. 6).
