= NCO =

NCO may refer to:

- NCO Group, an international corporation
- National Children's Orchestra of Great Britain
- Net capital outflow, an economic metric
- NetCDF Operators, software
- Network-centric operations, a theory of war in the information age
- Non-commissioned officer, a category of military rank
- Numerically controlled oscillator, a digital signal generator
- Nuova Camorra Organizzata, a defunct Italian criminal organization
- Isocyanate, a functional group of atoms –N=C=O
- Quonset State Airport, airport with this IATA code
- Indian National Congress (Organisation), a former Political Party in India formally referred as NCO by the Election Commission of India.
- Nevada–California–Oregon Railway, a defunct railway in the western United States
