= Metview =

- Logo of Metview
- Developer(s): European Centre for Medium-Range Weather Forecasts (ECMWF)
- Initial release: 1991; 34 years ago
- Stable release: 5.23.0 / 2 October 2024; 5 months ago
- Written in: C++ (Qt), C, Python
- Operating system: Linux, macOS
- Available in: British English
- Type: Scientific visualization
- License: Apache
- Website: metview.readthedocs.io

Metview is a meteorological workstation and batch system developed at the European Centre for Medium-Range Weather Forecasts (ECMWF).

== History ==
Development began at ECMWF in 1990 in co-operation with the National Institute for Space Research of Brazil and Météo-France.

Time line of Metview major versions and changes
Year	Version	Changes
1990	Announcement	Announcement at EGOWS
1991	First prototype	Batch system at National Institute for Space Research
1993	1.0	First batch and user interface
1998	2.0	Use of OpenGL for interactive visualisation
2000	3.0	New user interface (Motif)
2010	4.0	Upgrade to Magics++ graphics library; released as Open-source software under Apache License
2014	4.5	New user interface based on Qt version 4
2018	5.0	Switch to Qt version 5, improved plot window and new Python interface

== Features ==
=== User interface ===
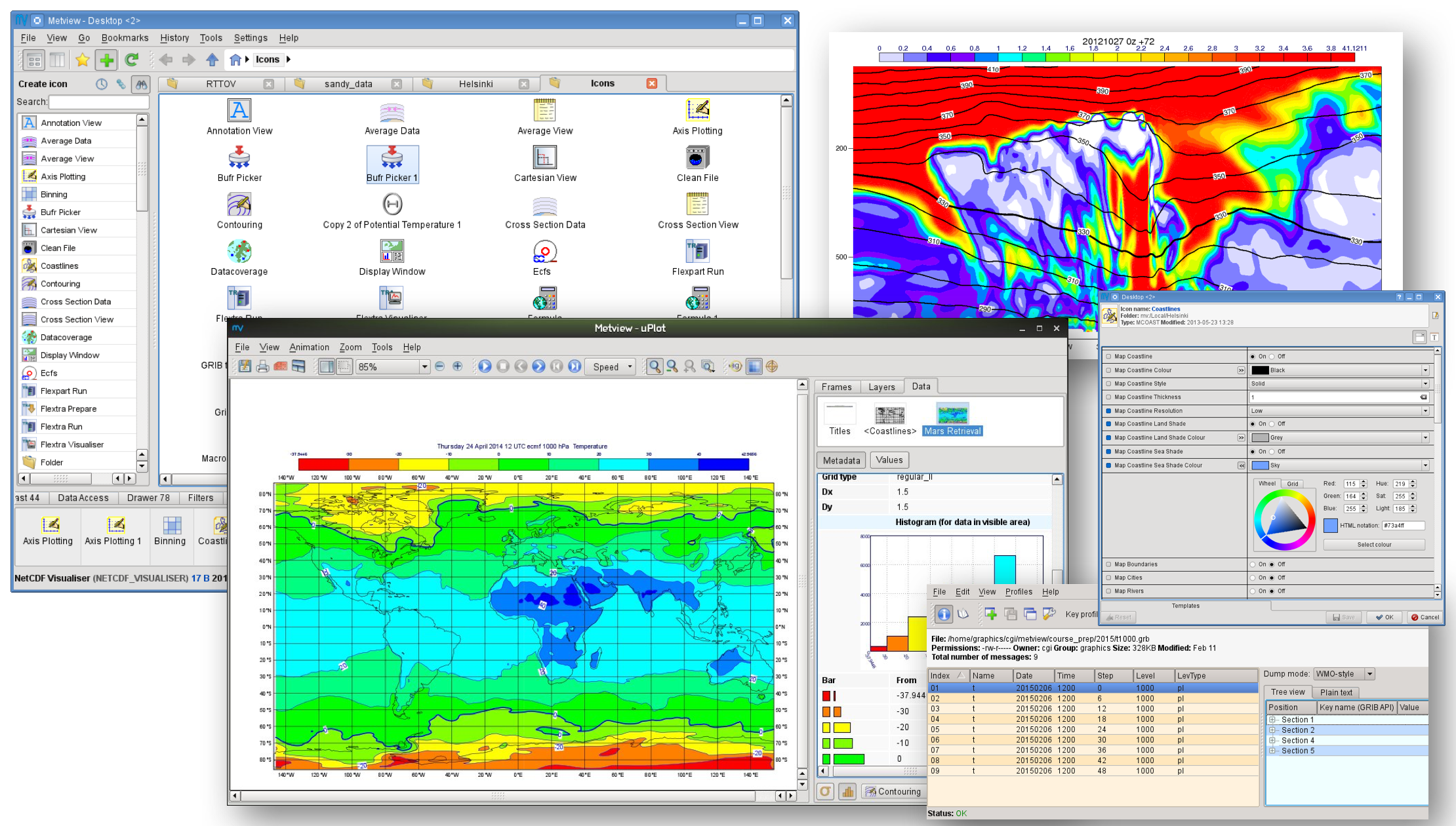
This screenshot of the Metview desktop shows its icon based interface and its visualisation abilities.

Metview has an icon based graphical user interface, where any aspect of a meteorological (graphical) product is expressed in an icon. Users can prototype a visualisation by dragging and dropping icons in the plot area.

Metview offers also various tools to explore and display the content of meteorological file formats, such as GRIdded Binary or General Regularly-distributed Information in Binary form (GRIB), Binary Universal Form for the Representation of meteorological data (BUFR), Network Common Data Form (NetCDF), and OpenDocument Database Front End Document Format (ODB).

=== Macro language for batch processing ===
The Macro language is designed as a high-level programming language to allow analysts and scientists to concentrate on the work and processing flow being developed.

# Metview Macro

# reading GRIB files through the read() function
a = read(mygrib1.grb)
b = read(mygrib2.grb)

# calculating the differences between two fields 
c = a-b

# plotting the result
plot(c)

In 2017 a Python version of the macro language was developed.

=== File format support ===
Metview supports the various meteorological data formats as input and output formats: GRIB (editions 1 and 2), BUFR, NetCDF, ODB (ECMWF Observation Database), Local databases and ASCII data files (comma-separated values, grids and scattered data)

== Development ==
All major developments are made at the Development Section at ECMWF. Most of the code is in C++ and the code is versioned in git. CMake is used as build system.

Metview makes use of other software packages developed at ECMWF. Metview is an extended MARS client, and uses ecCodes for GRIB and BUFR handling and Magics for contouring and visualisation.

== Distribution ==
Metview is distributed mainly as a source code tar file, termed a tarball, under an Apache License version 2.0. There are plans to distribute the code on GitHub.

Binary versions of Metview are available in conda (through the conda-forge channel), in Ubuntu and MacPorts. RPMs for major Linux distribution are provided on the Open Build Service.
