= World Meteorological Organization =

Specialized agency of the United Nations

- Abbreviation: WMO
- Formation: 23 March 1950; 76 years ago
- Type: United Nations specialized agency
- Legal status: Active
- Headquarters: Geneva, Switzerland
- Head: President; Abdulla Al Mandous, UAE (since 2023); Secretary-General; Celeste Saulo, Argentina since 2024
- Parent organization: United Nations Economic and Social Council
- Website: wmo.int

The World Meteorological Organization (WMO) is a specialized agency of the United Nations responsible for promoting international cooperation on atmospheric science, climatology, hydrology and geophysics.

The WMO originated from the International Meteorological Organization (IMO), a nongovernmental organization founded in 1873 as a forum for exchanging weather data and research. Proposals to reform the status and structure of the IMO culminated in the World Meteorological Convention of 1947, which formally established the World Meteorological Organization. The Convention entered into force on 23 March 1950, and the following year the WMO began operations as an intergovernmental organization within the United Nations System.

The WMO is made up of 193 countries and territories, and facilitates the "free and unrestricted" exchange of data, information, and research between the respective meteorological and hydrological institutions of its members. It also collaborates with nongovernmental partners and other international organizations on matters related to environmental protection, climate change, resource management, and socioeconomic development.

Headquartered in Geneva, Switzerland, the WMO is governed by the World Meteorological Congress, composed of member states, which meets every four years to set policies and priorities. The Congress is led by an Executive Council led by the President, currently Abdulla Al Mandous of UAE.

== History ==
Weather is a global phenomenon that ignores national borders. International cooperation on weather reporting began in the 1600s, but became a significant factor with the invention of the telegraph in 1843. Matthew Fontaine Maury, of the US Navy, initiated the convening of the first true international meteorological conference from late August through early September 1853. This led to the foundation of the International Meteorological Organization in 1873. The early efforts where non-governmental but grew into an intergovernmental effort.

In 1950, IMO was superseded by the World Meteorological Organization which facilitates the "free and unrestricted" exchange of data, information, and research between the respective meteorological and hydrological institutions of its members.

== Governance ==
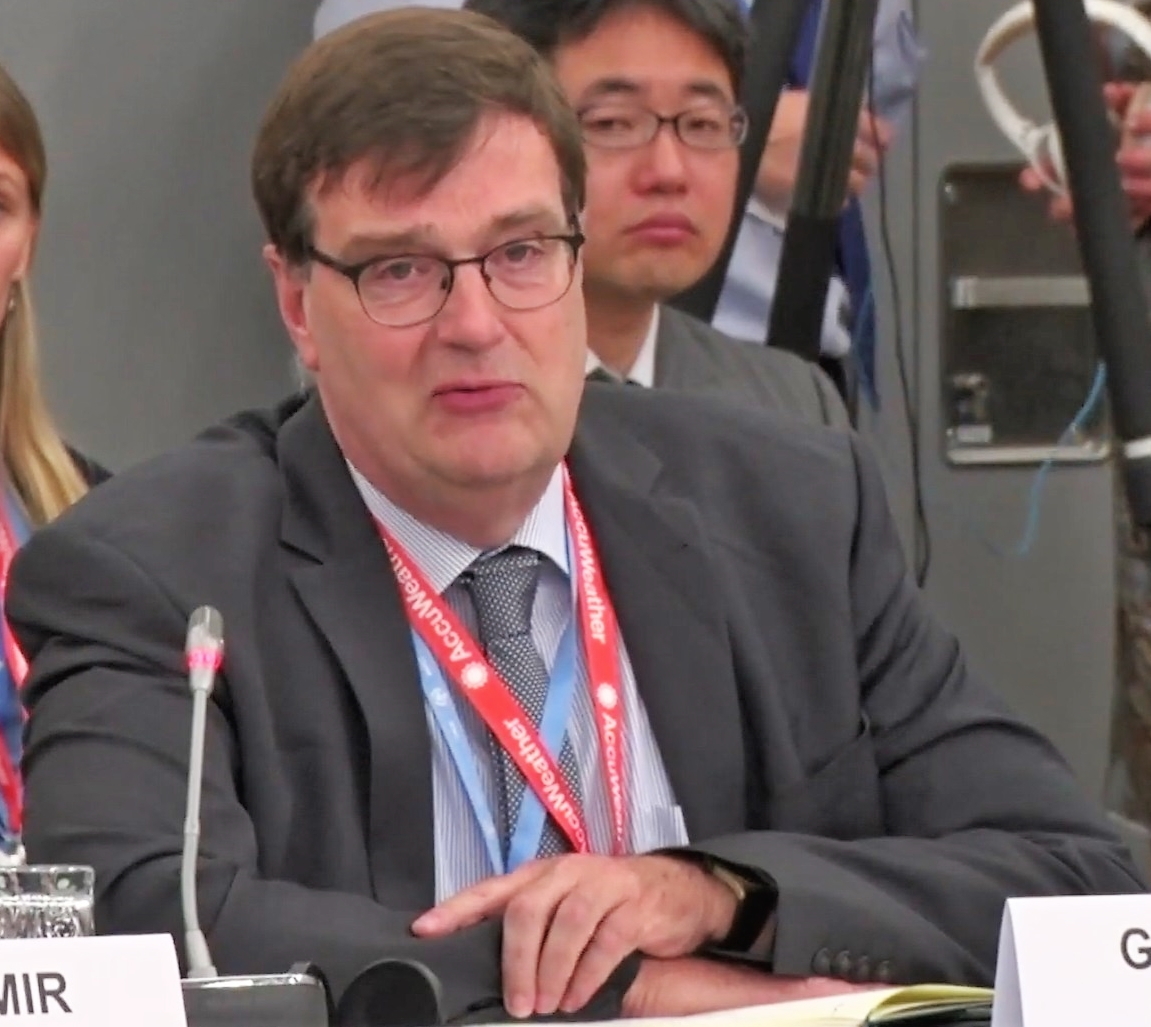
German meteorologist Gerhard Adrian, president of the World Meteorological Organization, in 2019

The WMO was established by the Convention of the World Meteorological Organization, signed 11 October 1947 and ratified on 23 March 1950. The Convention serves as the constituent treaty of the WMO, setting forth its purposes, governance, and general framework.

The WMO hierarchy:

- The World Meteorological Congress, the supreme body of the Organization, determines policy. Each member state and territory is represented by a Permanent Representative with WMO when Congress meets every four years. Congress elects the President and vice-presidents of the Organization and members of the Executive Council; and appoints the Secretary-General.
- The Executive Council (EC) implements Congress decisions.
- The Secretariat is an eight-department organization with a staff of 200 headed by a Secretary-General, who can serve a maximum of two four-year terms.

The annually published WMO Statement on the status of the World Climate provides details of global, regional and national temperatures and extreme weather events. It also provides information on long-term climate change indicators including atmospheric concentrations of greenhouse gases, sea level rise, and sea ice extent. The year 2016 was the hottest year on record, with many weather and climate extremes, according to the most recent WMO report.

As of August 2023, the WMO has a membership of 193 member states and territories.

=== List of secretaries-general ===
- 1952–1955 Gustav Swoboda (Switzerland)
- 1956–1979 David Arthur Davies (United Kingdom)
- 1980–1983 Aksel C. Wiin-Nielsen (Denmark)
- 1984–2003 Godwin Obasi (Nigeria)
- 2004–2015 Michel Jarraud (France)
- 2016–2023 Petteri Taalas (Finland)
- 2024–present Celeste Saulo (Argentina)

== WMO Strategic Plan ==
- Disaster risk reduction
- The Global Framework for Climate Services (GFCS)
- The WMO Integrated Global Observing System (WIGOS)
- Aviation meteorological services
- Polar and high mountain regions
- Capacity development
- Governance

== Meteorological codes ==
In keeping with its mandate to promote the standardization of meteorological observations, the WMO maintains numerous code forms for the representation and exchange of meteorological, oceanographical, and hydrological data. The traditional code forms, such as SYNOP, CLIMAT and TEMP, are character-based and their coding is position-based. Newer WMO code forms are designed for portability, extensibility and universality. These are BUFR, and, for gridded geo-positioned data, GRIB.

== Recognitions received ==
In 2007, the Intergovernmental Panel on Climate Change (IPCC), a joint creation of the WMO and the United Nations Environment Programme (UNEP), received the Nobel Peace Prize "for their efforts to build up and disseminate greater knowledge about anthropogenic (man-made) climate change, and to lay the foundations for the measures that are needed to counteract such change."

In 2025, WMO's IMO Legacy Collection was inscribed on UNESCO's Memory of the World International Register. The collection consists of physical and digital books, pamphlets, maps, and graphs published by IMO during the nineteenth and early-twentieth centuries. It is currently being digitized and made available from WMO's e-Library.

== World Meteorological Day ==
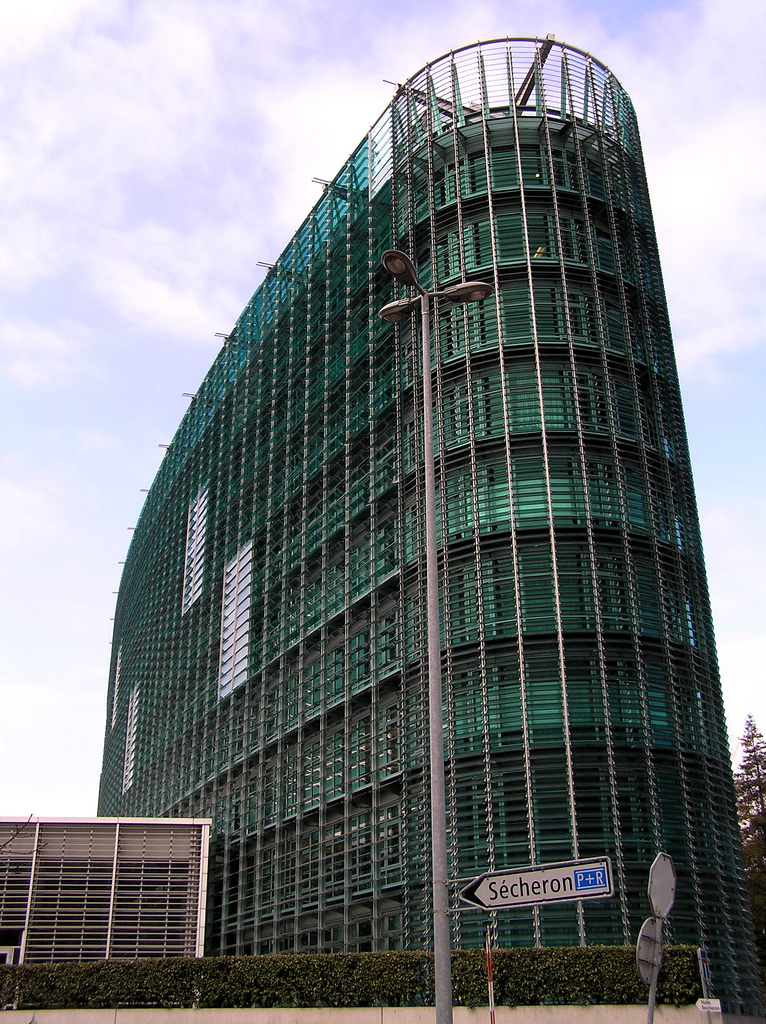
WMO headquarters in Geneva, shared with the IPCC and the Group on Earth Observations

The World Meteorological Day is held annually on 23 March.

== Use of the International System of Units ==
WMO states that "the International System of Units (SI) should be used as the system of units for the evaluation of meteorological elements included in reports for international exchange." The following units, which include units which are not SI units, are recommended by the WMO for meteorological observations:

- Degrees Celsius (°C) for temperature, or alternatively Kelvin (K).
- Metres per second (m/s) for wind speed.
- Degrees clockwise from north (°) for wind direction, or alternatively on the scale 0–36, where 36 is the wind directly from north and 09 is the directly wind from east.
- Hectopascals (hPa) for atmospheric pressure.
- Percent (%) for relative humidity.
- Millimetres (mm) for precipitation (or the equivalent unit kilograms per square metre (kg/m^{2})).
- Millimetres (mm) for evaporation.
- Millimetres per hour (mm/h) for precipitation intensity, or alternatively kilograms per square metre per second (kg m^{−2} s^{−1}).
- Hours (h) for sunshine duration.
- Metres (m) for visibility.
- Metres (m) for cloud height.
- Standard geopotential metre (m') for geopotential height.
- Kilograms per square metre (kg/m^{2}) for snow water equivalent.
- Watts per square metre (W/m^{2}) for irradiance.
- Joules per square metre (J/m^{2}) for radiant exposure.
- Oktas for cloud cover.

== Main public outreach materials ==
- The World Meteorological Organization at a Glance
- WMO for Youth
- WMO Bulletin (twice annually)
- WMO Greenhouse Gas Bulletin (annually)
- WMO Statements on the Status of the World Climate (annually)
- In September 2020 the WMO published a high-level brief compilation of the latest climate science information from the WMO, GCP, UNESCO-IOC, IPCC, UNEP and the Met Office. The United in Science 2020 Report is subdivided into 7 chapters, which each have a list of key messages.

== WMO awards and prizes ==
- International Meteorological Organization Prize
- Professor Dr Vilho Väisälä Awards
- Norbert Gerbier-Mumm International Award (suspended in 2014)
- WMO Research Award for Young Scientists
- Professor Mariolopoulus Award

== Membership ==
As of 2023, WMO Members include a total of 187 Member States and 6 Member Territories.

Eight United Nations member states are not members of WMO: Equatorial Guinea, Grenada, Liechtenstein, Marshall Islands, Palau, Saint Kitts and Nevis, Saint Vincent and the Grenadines and San Marino. Cook Islands and Niue are WMO Members but non-members of the United Nations. Vatican City and State of Palestine and the states with limited recognition are not members of either organization.

The six WMO Member Territories are the British Caribbean Territories (joint meteorological organization and membership), French Polynesia, Hong Kong, Macau, New Caledonia, and Curaçao and Sint Maarten with a joint meteorological service and membership

=== Membership by regional associations ===
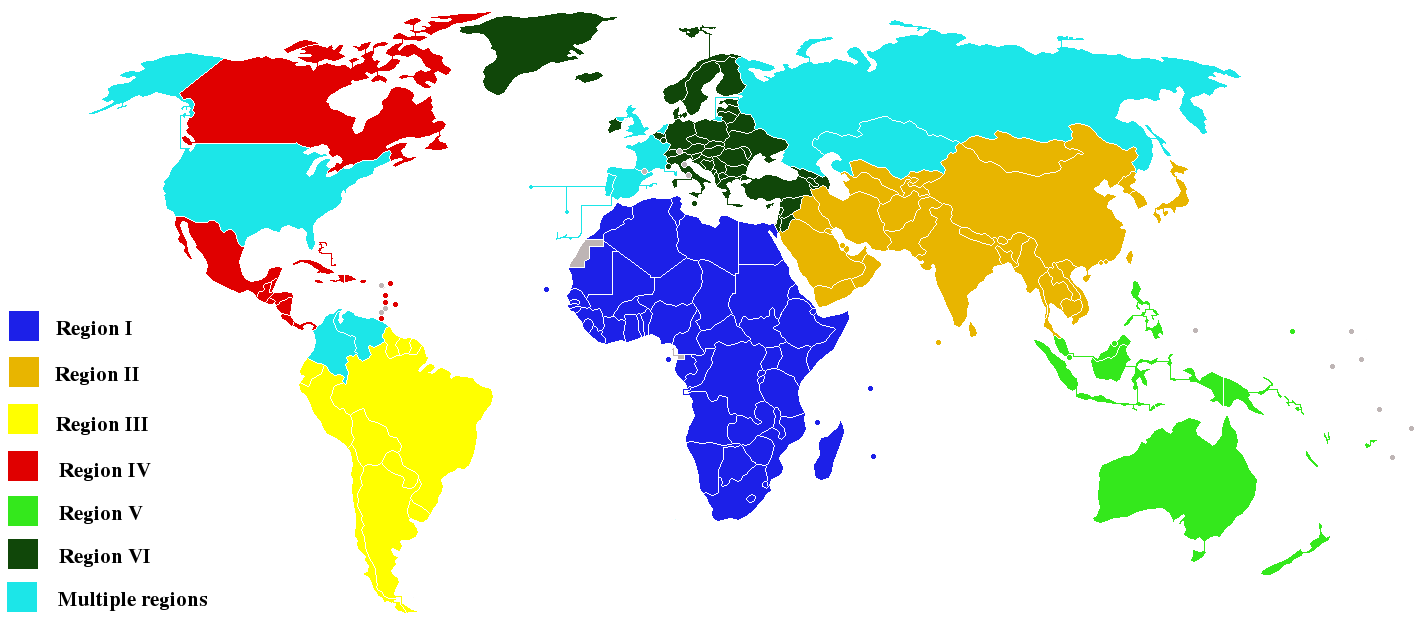
The member states of the World Meteorological Organization divided into the six regional associations, shown on a world map

==== Regional Association I (Africa) ====
Region I consists of the states of Africa and a few former colonial powers. Region I has 57 member states and no member territories:

- Algeria
- Angola
- Benin
- Botswana
- Burkina Faso
- Burundi
- Cameroon
- Cape Verde
- Central African Republic
- Chad
- Comoros
- Republic of the Congo
- Côte d'Ivoire
- Democratic Republic of the Congo
- Djibouti
- Egypt
- Eritrea
- Eswatini
- Ethiopia
- France
- Gabon
- The Gambia
- Ghana
- Guinea
- Guinea-Bissau
- Kenya
- Lesotho
- Liberia
- Libya
- Madagascar
- Malawi
- Mali
- Mauritania
- Mauritius
- Morocco
- Mozambique
- Namibia
- Niger
- Nigeria
- Portugal
- Rwanda
- São Tomé and Príncipe
- Senegal
- Seychelles
- Sierra Leone
- Somalia
- South Africa
- South Sudan
- Spain
- Sudan
- Tanzania, United Republic of
- Togo
- Tunisia
- Uganda
- United Kingdom of Great Britain and Northern Ireland
- Zambia
- Zimbabwe

Non-member

- Equatorial Guinea

==== Regional Association II (Asia) ====
Region II has 33 member states and 2 member territories. The member states are:

- Afghanistan
- Bahrain
- Bangladesh
- Bhutan
- Cambodia
- People's Republic of China
- India
- Iran, Islamic Republic of
- Iraq
- Japan
- Kazakhstan
- Democratic People's Republic of Korea
- Kuwait
- Kyrgyzstan
- Lao People's Democratic Republic
- Maldives
- Mongolia
- Myanmar
- Nepal
- Oman
- Pakistan
- Qatar
- Russian Federation
- Saudi Arabia
- Republic of Korea
- Sri Lanka
- Tajikistan
- Thailand
- Turkmenistan
- United Arab Emirates
- Uzbekistan
- Viet Nam
- Yemen

The member territories are:

- Hong Kong
- Macau

==== Regional Association III (South America) ====
Region III consists of the states of South America, including France as French Guiana is an overseas region of France. It has a total of 13 member states and no member territories:

- Argentina
- Bolivia
- Brazil
- Chile
- Colombia
- Ecuador
- French Guiana
- Guyana
- Paraguay
- Peru
- Suriname
- Uruguay
- Venezuela

==== Regional Association IV (North America, Central America and the Caribbean) ====
Region IV consists of the states of North America, Central America, and the Caribbean, including three European states with dependencies within the region. It has a total of 25 member states and 2 member territories. The member states are:

- Antigua and Barbuda
- Bahamas
- Barbados
- Belize
- Canada
- Colombia
- Costa Rica
- Cuba
- Dominica
- Dominican Republic
- El Salvador
- France
- Guatemala
- Haiti
- Honduras
- Jamaica
- Mexico
- Netherlands
- Nicaragua
- Panama
- Saint Lucia
- Trinidad and Tobago
- United Kingdom of Great Britain and Northern Ireland
- United States of America
- Venezuela

The two member territories are:

- British Caribbean Territories
- Curaçao and Sint Maarten

Non-members

- Grenada
- Saint Kitts and Nevis
- Saint Vincent and the Grenadines

==== Regional Association V (South-West Pacific) ====
Region V consists of 23 member states and 2 member territories. The member states are:

- Australia
- Brunei Darussalam
- Cook Islands
- Fiji
- France
- Indonesia
- Kiribati
- Malaysia
- Federated States of Micronesia
- Nauru
- New Zealand
- Niue
- Papua New Guinea
- Philippines
- Samoa
- Singapore
- Solomon Islands
- Timor-Leste
- Tonga
- Tuvalu
- United Kingdom of Great Britain and Northern Ireland
- United States of America
- Vanuatu

The Cook Islands and Niue (both are in free association with New Zealand)

The member territories are:

- French Polynesia
- New Caledonia

Non-members

- Marshall Islands
- Palau

==== Regional Association VI (Europe) ====
Region VI consists of all the states in Europe as well as some Western Asia. It has 50 member states:

- Albania
- Andorra
- Armenia
- Austria
- Azerbaijan
- Belarus
- Belgium
- Bosnia and Herzegovina
- Bulgaria
- Croatia
- Cyprus
- Czech Republic
- Denmark
- Estonia
- Finland
- France
- Georgia
- Germany
- Greece
- Hungary
- Iceland
- Ireland
- Israel
- Italy
- Jordan
- Kazakhstan
- Latvia
- Lebanon
- Lithuania
- Luxembourg
- Malta
- Monaco
- Montenegro
- Netherlands
- North Macedonia
- Norway
- Poland
- Portugal
- Romania
- Republic of Moldova
- Russian Federation
- Serbia
- Slovakia
- Slovenia
- Spain
- Sweden
- Switzerland
- Syrian Arab Republic
- Turkey
- Ukraine
- United Kingdom of Great Britain and Northern Ireland

Non-members

- Liechtenstein
- San Marino

==== States with membership in more than one region ====
A total of ten member states have membership in more than one region. Two nations are members to four different regions, while eight are members of two regions. These nations, with their regions, are as follows:

- France (Regions I, III, IV, and VI)
- United Kingdom (Regions I, IV, V, and VI)
- Colombia (Regions III and IV)
- Kazakhstan (Regions II and VI)
- Netherlands (Regions IV and VI)
- Portugal (Regions I and VI)
- Russia (Regions II and VI)
- Spain (Regions I and VI)
- United States (Regions IV and V)
- Venezuela (Regions III and IV)

== See also ==
- Aircraft Meteorological Data Relay (AMDAR)
- Cloud atlas
- Global Atmospheric Research Program (GARP)
- Global Climate Observing System
- International Cloud Atlas
- Regional Specialized Meteorological Centre
