= SYNOP =

Standardized weather observation code

SYNOP (surface synoptic observations) is a numerical code (called FM-12 by WMO) used for reporting weather observations made by staffed and automated weather stations. SYNOP reports are typically sent every six hours by Deutscher Wetterdienst on shortwave and low frequency using RTTY. A report consists of groups of numbers (and slashes where data is not available) describing general weather information, such as the temperature, barometric pressure and visibility at a weather station. It can be decoded by open-source software such as seaTTY, metaf2xml or Fldigi.

SYNOP information is collected by more than 7600 staffed and unstaffed meteorological stations and more than 2500 mobile stations around the world and is used for weather forecasting and climatic statistics. The format of the original messages is abbreviated, and some items are coded.

== Message format ==
Following is the general structure of a SYNOP message. The message consists of a sequence of numeric groups, which may also contain slashes (indicating missing data) in addition to numeric digits. Leading numbers are fixed group indicators that indicate the type of observation following, and letters are replaced with numbers giving the weather data. Messages from shipboard weather stations, and in different regions of the world, use variations on this scheme.

 YYGGiw IIiii iRiXhVV Nddff (00fff) 1snTTT 2snTdTdTd 3PoPoPoPo 4PPPP 5appp 6RRRtR 7wwW1W2 8NhCLCMCH (9GGgg)

- YYGGi_{w}: the date and time of the observation; YY for the day of the month, GG for the hour of the observation in UTC; i_{w} for the manner of wind observation (a code number: 0 for estimated wind speed in meters per second, 1 for measured wind speed in meters per second, 3 and 4 likewise but in knots, or slash for no wind speed observations).
- IIiii: weather station identification code; II for a block number allocated (by the WMO) to a country or a region of the world, for example 02 for Scandinavia or 72 and 74 for the continental US; iii is the code of an individual station within a block. (For example, 02993 is the code of the weather station on Märket, 74794 of Cape Canaveral).
- i_{R}i_{X}hVV:
  - i_{R} indicates whether precipitation data is included or omitted. This is a code number from 0 to 4, with 0, 1 and 2 meaning data is included, and 3 and 4 indicating no precipitation data.
  - i_{X} is a code number indicating the manner of station operation, and the format used in group 7wwWW; codes 1, 2 and 3 indicate a staffed station, while codes 4 to 7 indicate an automatic station.
  - h indicates the height above the surface for the base of the lowest cloud seen: 0 means from 0 to 100 feet or 0 to 50 meters, 9 means the base of clouds is 2500 meters or higher or that there are no clouds.
  - VV indicates horizontal surface visibility:
    - For codes 00 to 50, this indicates visibility in tenths of a kilometer (hectometers), for example "15" means 1.5 km.
    - For codes 56 to 80, 50 is subtracted, and the resulting number indicates visibility in kilometers, for example "66" means 16 km.
    - Codes 81 to 88 indicate visibility in a multiple of 5 km; "81" for 35 km, "88" for 70 km. Code 89 indicates visibility greater than 70 km;
    - Codes 90 to 99 are used for shipboard observations, from "90" for less than 1/16 mile visibility, "95" for 1 mile, "99" for greater than 30 miles.
- Nddff and 00fff:
  - N: total cloud cover in eighths of the sky (oktas); "0" for no clouds, "4" for half (4/8) of the sky obscured, "8" for total cloud cover, "9" for an obscured sky or a situation where cloud cover can't be estimated, "/" for no measurement in the case of automatic stations.
  - dd for true wind direction in tens of degrees, with "00" meaning "no wind", "18" for wind from the south (175° to 184°), "36" for wind from the north (355° to 004°).
  - ff for wind speed, in the units specified in the YYGGi_{w} group. If wind speed is 99 units or more, this group will have the code "99" and will immediately be followed by the group 00fff, with the wind speed indicated there instead.
- 1s_{n}TTT: air temperature. Code s_{n} indicates the sign, 0 for positive, 1 for negative degrees; TTT has the temperature in tenths of a degree Celsius.
- 2s_{n}T_{d}T_{d}T_{d}: dew point temperature. Like the preceding 1s_{n}TTT group, s_{n} stands for the sign, and T_{d}T_{d}T_{d} has the temperature in tenths of a degree Celsius. If s_{n} is 9, the last three digits are instead relative humidity in percent, from "000" to "100".
- 3P_{o}P_{o}P_{o}P_{o}: air pressure at station level, in tenths of a hectopascal. If the pressure is more than 999.9 hPa, the leading thousands digit is dropped; for example 30240 means a pressure of 1024.0 hPa.
- 4PPPP: air pressure at sea level, in tenths of a hectopascal, derived from station pressure.
- 5appp: three-hour pressure tendency. The digit a encodes the manner of pressure change, for example "3" means "decreasing or steady, then increasing; or increasing, then increasing more rapidly". Codes 1 to 3 indicate higher pressure than 3 hours ago, codes 6 to 8 indicate lower pressure, while codes 0, 4 and 5 indicate approximately the same pressure. Digits ppp indicate the actual pressure change, in tenths of a hectopascal.
- 6RRRt_{R}: amount of precipitation, in millimeters. Digit t_{R} indicates the length of time covered by this group, such as a measurement over the past 6, 12, 18 or 24 hours.
- 7wwW_{1}W_{2}: present (ww) and past (W_{1}W_{2}) weather. Staffed and automatic stations use different formats and tables for this group. These are looked up from a table, with various different codes, such as "35" for "severe duststorm or sandstorm, has begun or has increased during the preceding hour".
- 8N_{h}C_{L}C_{M}C_{H}: cloud types. N_{h} indicates amount of low-altitude clouds (in oktas, like in the Nddff group), or if none, the amount of medium-altitude clouds. C_{L}, C_{M} and C_{H} indicate the types of low, medium, and high-altitude clouds present, with codes looked up from tables.
- 9GGgg: actual time of observation, in hours and minutes UTC, used when the actual time differs more than 10 minutes from the time reported in the YYGGi_{w} group.

After this first section, stations may include additional sections, prefixed by 222// (section 2, for staffed coastal stations, reporting sea surface temperature and wave data), 333 (section 3, used only in some areas of the world, for the "state of the sky in the tropics"), or 555 (various national code groups).

=== Example message ===
This observation was from April 1, 2022, from LaGuardia Airport in New York City.

 01124 72503 12566 63015 10106 20050 30003 40016 53048 60071 91151
 333 10178 20106 70079 91021

- 01124: First day of the month (01), 12:00 UTC (12), with wind speed in knots, measured by anemometer (4).
- 72503: The station's WMO index, New York, La Guardia Airport.
- 12566: Precipitation data is included in section 1 (1), station is staffed (2), past weather observations (group 7wwW1W2) not included (2), base of lowest observed cloud is from 600 to 999 m (5), horizontal visibility at surface 16 km (66).
- 63015: Total cloud cover 6/8 of the sky (6), wind direction is between 295° and 304° (30), wind speed 15 knots (15).
- 10106: Temperature 10.6 °C.
- 20050: Dew point temperature 5.0 °C.
- 30003: Pressure at station level 1000.3 hPa.
- 40016: Calculated pressure at sea level: 1001.6 hPa.
- 53048: Over the last three hours, pressure has first decreased and then increased, to end up higher than in the last report (3); pressure change since last report 4.8 hPa (048).
- 60071: 7.0 mm precipitation (007) over the past six hours (1).
- 91151: Actual time of observation 11:51 UTC.
- 333: Start of section 3.
- 10178: Maximum temperature over the past day 17.8 °C.
- 20106: Minimum temperature over the past day 10.6 °C.
- 70079: 7.9 mm precipitation over the past 24 hours.
- 91021: Special phenomena.

Although this coded data is still available from three American universities it has now been replaced by a universal digital coding system so data can be shared in the same format whatever the source of the observations. This enables Synop, Metar, upperair and satellite data to be processed by a common computer system.

The short wave radio transmission of Synop data was common in the 1980s from Bracknell or Paris but this is now redundant. Synop data is available as downloadable files from a number of internet sites including the College of DuPage.

== See also ==
- METAR
- CLIMAT
- BUFR

== Surface and SYNOP datasets ==
- National Weather Service data
- Weathergraphics site sells 3 volumes of current and historical SYNOP data (both coded and decoded SYNOP)
- OGIMET provides free access to historical SYNOP data (decoded data available)
- Archive at Iowa State University (coded data, go to a date, text, syn)
- Surface data, not specifically SYNOP
- Meteomanz provides observed weather data from locations around the world obtained from SYNOP and BUFR messages issued by official weather stations
