= TEMP (meteorology) =

Earth sciences data format

TEMP (upper air soundings) are weather reports generated by radiosondes (weather balloons) that measure atmospheric conditions at various altitudes. These observations provide data on temperature, pressure, humidity, and wind from the surface to the upper atmosphere. TEMP reports are essential for weather forecasting and environmental monitoring, helping meteorologists analyse the vertical profile of our atmosphere.

The World Meteorological Organization (WMO) uses specific alphanumeric codes to classify these reports:

FM-35
For surface-based TEMP reports (from land stations).
FM-36
For ship-based TEMP reports (from ships at sea).
