= XMDF =

eXtensible Model Data Format
- Initial release: 2005
- Latest release: 2.2; January 20, 2017
- Type of format: scientific data format
- Container for: HDF5
- Website: http://www.xmdf.org

XMDF (eXtensible Model Data Format) is a library providing a standard format for the geometric data storage of river cross-sections, 2D/3D structured and unstructured meshes, geometric paths through space, and associated time data. XMDF uses HDF5 for cross-platform data storage and compression. It was initiated in Engineer Research and Development Center (ERDC) and is developed by Aquaveo (formerly the Environmental Modeling Research Laboratory (EMRL) at Brigham Young University). API includes interfaces for C/C++ and Fortran.

An overview of the format was published by the ERDC in 2007. More recent documentation is available online at https://www.xmswiki.com/wiki/XMDF. A binary format was chosen for the data in order to improve performance and data storage as compared with more traditional ASCII grids. The group considered both the NetCDF and HDF5 data formats, and chose HDF5 because it has more flexibility for data storage, compression and data mining. It also supports data folders and data structures, making it more customizable.

The modeling format is used by hydrologic modeling software such as TUFLOW, SMS, GMS, and WMS.

== See also ==
- Computational Fluid Dynamics General Notation System (CGNS)
