= Another System Definition Facility =

ASDF Another System Definition Facility
- Stable release: 3.3.7 / January 28, 2024; 2 years ago
- Operating system: Linux, FreeBSD, NetBSD, OpenBSD
- License: Expat License
- Website: common-lisp.net/project/asdf/
- Repository: gitlab.common-lisp.net/asdf/asdf.git

ASDF (Another System Definition Facility) is a package format and a build tool for Common Lisp libraries. It is analogous to tools such as Make and Ant.

== History ==
ASDF was originally designed and written in 2001-2002 as a successor for a previous program, mk-defsystem, taking advantage of Common Lisp features such as CLOS and pathname support. It has since expanded to become the default build tool for Common Lisp programs. It is now used as the basis for Common Lisp library build systems, and dependency managers, such as Quicklisp, cl-build, and Debian's Common Lisp Controller. (Note: ASDF-Install is obsolete.) Most maintained, open-source Common Lisp libraries are buildable and installable through ASDF.

== Uses ==
Installing and building open-source systems defined with ASDF is now a relatively easy thanks to Quicklisp. In cases where the user is forced to install ASDF libraries by hand, as may still happen, the user will be forced to first download and unpack the library in a location recognized by the user's source-registry, which has sensible defaults (at least on Unix) and can otherwise be configured.

Creating and defining systems installable though ASDF is done through the creation and placement of one or more system definition (.asd) files at the root of a directory containing the files that make up the system. The system definition file must contain at least one call to defsystem, a lisp form in which are defined all of the components and dependencies of the system. ASDF is capable of automatically compiling and loading lisp source code, as well as automatically building and linking C programming language (also known as C source code). It contains hooks to allow for definitions of alternate compilers and complex treatment of custom components.
