= CLIMAT =

CLIMAT is a code for reporting monthly climatological data assembled at land-based meteorological surface observation sites to data centres. CLIMAT-coded messages contain information on several meteorological variables that are important to monitor characteristics, changes, and variability of climate. Usually these messages are sent and exchanged via the Global Telecommunication System (GTS) of the World Meteorological Organisation (WMO). Modifications of the CLIMAT code are the CLIMAT SHIP and CLIMAT TEMP / CLIMAT TEMP SHIP codes which serve to report monthly climatological data assembled at ocean-based meteorological surface observation sites and at land-/ocean-based meteorological upper-air observation sites, respectively. The monthly values included usually are obtained by averaging observational values of one or several daily observations over the respective month.

== Contents of CLIMAT (TEMP) (SHIP) messages ==
CLIMAT-messages contain comprehensive information on a variety of climate-relevant meteorological parameters such as monthly mean temperature, mean daily maximum and minimum temperatures of the month, monthly mean pressure, monthly mean vapour pressure, total precipitation for the month and total sunshine for the month. Information on so-called normal values of these parameters, usually averaged over a period of 30 years for a specific month, can also be transmitted with CLIMAT-messages. Data on extreme values of certain parameters and days of a month with certain parameters exceeding defined thresholds can also be included, as well as information on the number of days of a month where data are missing for a certain parameter. CLIMAT SHIP messages contain information on fewer variables (e.g., total sunshine for the month and extreme values are not included). CLIMAT TEMP (SHIP)-messages contain information on monthly mean temperature, monthly mean geopotential, monthly mean dew-point depression and wind characteristics at specific pressure surfaces.

== Characteristics of the CLIMAT code ==
The CLIMAT code has a fixed but logic syntax that needs to be followed strictly to maintain the ability of a computing device that processes the code to assign the contained information correctly. A CLIMAT-coded message can contain information from more than one synoptic stations and the CLIMAT-coded material for each station is called a “CLIMAT report”. A CLIMAT report is basically structured into five so-called sections (sections 0 to 4) which contain different types of information. If a CLIMAT message is transmitted via the Global Telecommunication System, the message is called a “CLIMAT bulletin”, as some extra coding may be added.

== Future developments ==
Due to the WMO-led development of the new digital BUFR and CREX coding formats and their implementation to meteorological reporting, CLIMAT coding will continually be transformed in these new formats or even be replaced in the future. Notwithstanding, CLIMAT-based reporting will still play an essential role in obtaining climate information in the upcoming decades, as many national meteorological services will not change to the BUFR format rapidly and climate relevant variables should be monitored uninterruptedly to obtain useful records. The CLIMAT SHIP code is only very seldom used since different, more specific codes for reporting data from fixed ocean locations, such as buoys, exist.
The monthly climatological upper-air data included in CLIMAT TEMP (SHIP) can basically also be derived from daily reports, due to improvements in collection and exchange of the daily TEMP messages and improved real-time quality control, and therefore discontinuing these messages is currently discussed.

== Applications ==
The data of CLIMAT reports are broadly used in meteorological and climatological applications, such as the generation of time-series, climate monitoring and climate modelling. Increasing quality and quantity of CLIMAT reports sent from meteorological observation sites ameliorates the generation of these products.
Climate monitoring products generated from CLIMAT messages e.g. are deviations of monthly air temperature compared to the 1961-1990 reference period.

== Amelioration of messages ==
WMO and the Global Climate Observing System (GCOS) disseminate information on CLIMAT reporting via handbooks/guides, and the Manual on Codes (WMO No. 306), e.g. via the internet. For simplifying the forming of CLIMAT reports, the WMO World Climate Programme and GCOS have set up a software called “CLIREP” which provides a user interface where data can be inserted and are processed automatically to form a correct CLIMAT message. For the compilation of CLIMAT coded messages a simple text-editor is sufficient as messages can be sent as “.txt”-files. Therefore it is also possible to send CLIMAT messages via email to the GCOS Surface Network (GSN) monitoring centres that monitor and supervise the worldwide CLIMAT reporting.

== See also ==
- METAR
- SYNOP
