= Ferret Data Visualization and Analysis =

Earth science visualisation software

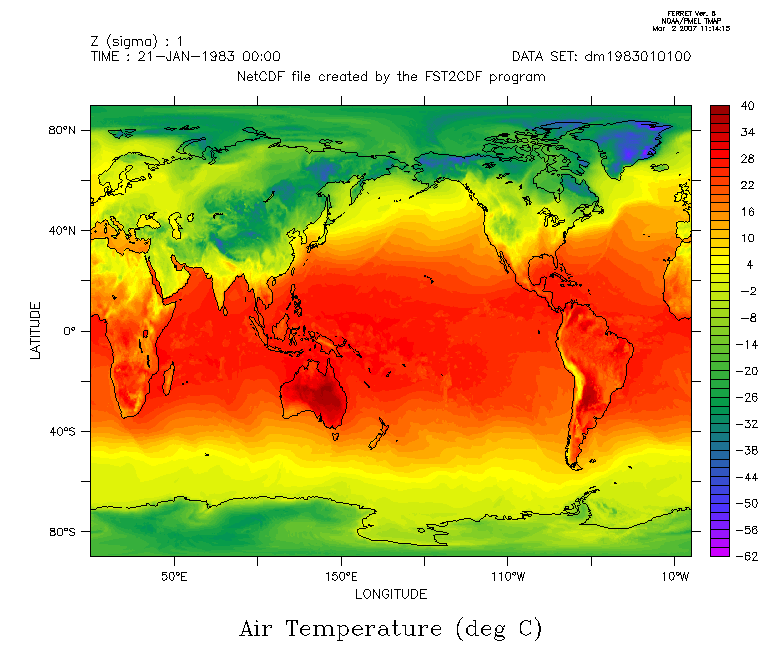
Typical view of the Ferret program

Ferret is an interactive computer visualization and analysis environment designed to meet the needs of oceanographers and meteorologists analyzing large and complex gridded data sets. Ferret offers a Mathematica-like approach to analysis; new variables may be defined interactively as mathematical expressions involving data set variables. Calculations may be applied over arbitrarily shaped regions. Fully documented graphics are produced with a single command. It runs on most Unix and Linux systems using X Window for display, and on Windows XP/NT/9x.
