= NetCDF Operators =

netCDF Operators (NCO)
- Developer(s): the NCO project
- Initial release: 1995
- Stable release: 4.9.8 (Death Valley) / 21 March 2021; 4 years ago
- Repository: github.com/nco/nco
- Written in: C and C++
- Operating system: Linux, Mac OS X, Microsoft Windows, Solaris, IBM AIX, DEC Alpha, IRIX
- Available in: English
- Type: Earth sciences software
- License: GNU General Public License
- Website: nco.sourceforge.net

NCO (netCDF Operators) is a suite of programs designed to facilitate manipulation and analysis of self-describing data stored in the netCDF format.

== Program Suite ==
ncap2
netCDF arithmetic processor
ncatted
netCDF attribute editor
ncbo
netCDF binary operator (includes addition, multiplication and others)
ncclimo
netCDF climatology generator
nces
netCDF ensemble statistics
ncecat
netCDF ensemble concatenator
ncflint
netCDF file interpolator
ncks
netCDF kitchen sink
ncpdq
netCDF permute dimensions quickly, pack data quietly
ncra
netCDF record averager
ncrcat
netCDF record concatenator
ncremap
netCDF remapper
ncrename
netCDF renamer
ncwa
netCDF weighted averager
