= Tecplot =

Tecplot, Inc.
- Tecplot 360 on Linux
- Stable release: Tecplot 360 2020 R2 / July 15, 2020
- Operating system: Windows, OS X, Linux
- Type: Plotting
- License: Trialware
- Website: www.tecplot.com

Tecplot is a family of visualization & analysis software tools developed by American company Tecplot, Inc., which is headquartered in Bellevue, Washington. The firm was formerly operated as Amtec Engineering. In 2016, the firm was acquired by Vela Software, an operating group of Constellation Software, Inc. (TSX:CSU).

== Tecplot 360 ==
Tecplot 360 is a Computational Fluid Dynamics (CFD) and numerical simulation software package used in post-processing simulation results. Tecplot 360 is also used in chemistry applications to visualize molecule structure by post-processing charge density data.

Common tasks associated with post-processing analysis of flow solver (e.g. Fluent, OpenFOAM) data include calculating grid quantities (e.g. aspect ratios, skewness, orthogonality and stretch factors), normalizing data; Deriving flow field functions like pressure coefficient or vorticity magnitude, verifying solution convergence, estimating the order of accuracy of solutions, interactively exploring data through cut planes (a slice through a region), iso-surfaces (3-D maps of concentrations), particle paths (dropping an object in the "fluid" and watching where it goes).

Tecplot 360 may be used to visualize output from programming languages such as Fortran. Tecplot's native data format is PLT or SZPLT. Many other formats are also supported, including:

CFD Formats: VTK, CGNS, FLOW-3D (Flow Science, Inc.), ANSYS CFX, ANSYS FLUENT .cas and .dat format and polyhedra, OpenFOAM, PLOT3D (Flow Science, Inc.), Tecplot and polyhedra, Ensight Gold, HDF5 (Hierarchical Data Format), CONVERGE CFD (Convergent Science), and Barracuda Virtual Reactor (CPFD Software).

Data Formats: HDF, Microsoft Excel (Windows only), comma- or space-delimited ASCII.

FEA Formats: Abaqus, ANSYS, FIDAP Neutral, LSTC/DYNA LS-DYNA, NASTRAN MSC Software, Patran MSC Software, PTC Mechanica, SDRC/IDEAS universal and 3D Systems STL.

ParaView supports Tecplot format through a VisIt importer.

== Tecplot RS ==
Tecplot RS is a tool tailored towards visualizing the results of reservoir simulations, which model the flow of fluids through porous media, as in oil and gas fields, and aquifers.

== Tecplot Focus ==
Tecplot Focus is plotting software designed for measured field data, performance plotting of test data, mathematical analysis, and general engineering plotting.

== Tecplot Chorus ==
Tecplot Chorus is a data management, design optimization, and aero database development framework used for comparing collections of CFD simulations.

== See also ==
- List of computational fluid dynamics software
