= Climbing (disambiguation) =

Climbing is the human activity of ascending a steep object with the hands and/or feet.

Climbing, Climb or The climb may also refer to:

== Apparel and equipment ==
- Climbing equipment, and the related items such as:
  - Climbing harness
  - Climbing rope
  - Climbing shoe
  - Rock-climbing equipment
- Climbing wall (or the related Climbing gym)

== Arts, entertainment, and media ==
=== Films ===
- The Climb (1986 film), a drama film starring Bruce Greenwood
- The Climb (1999 film), a drama film starring John Hurt
- The Climb (2002 film), an action film starring Jason George
- The Climb (2007 film), a documentary film starring Laurie Skreslet
- The Climb (2017 film), a French adventure comedy film adapting the story of Nadir Dendoune
- The Climb (2019 film), an American comedy-drama film

=== Music ===
- Climb, a Canadian AOR group
- Climbing!, a 1970 album by Mountain
- "Climbing", by the Meat Puppets from Meat Puppets II
- "The Climb" (song), a 2009 song by Miley Cyrus from the soundtrack of Hannah Montana: The Movie
- "The Climb", a song by The Coasters
- "The Climb", a 1964 song by The Kingsmen
- "The Climb", a song by No Doubt from the album Tragic Kingdom (1995)

=== Television ===
- "Climbing", an episode of the television series Zoboomafoo
- "The Climb" (Arrow), season 3 episode 9 of The CW's Arrow
- "The Climb" (Game of Thrones), season 3 episode 6 of HBO's Game of Thrones
- The Climb (2023 TV show), reality TV series

=== Other uses in arts, entertainment, and media ===
- Climbing (magazine), a US-based publication on rock climbing and bouldering
- The Climb (book), a 1996 non-fiction book by Anatoli Boukreev and G. Weston DeWalt
- The Climb (video game) is a video game in virtual reality, that requires players to climb game environments
  - The Climb 2, a sequel to The Climb

== Biology ==
- Arboreal locomotion, animal locomotion while on trees, rocks, mountains, or cliffs
- Climbing salamander
- Climbing shell vine
- Climbing shield fern
- Climbing shrew
- Climbing swamp mouse
- Climbing vine, any plant with a growth habit of trailing or scandent (that is, climbing) stems, lianas or runners

== Sports ==
- Climbing (sport), or the sport of climbing, which includes
  - Competition climbing, the Olympic sport
    - Speed climbing
  - Climbing technique
    - Free climbing
    - Free solo climbing
    - Lead climbing
  - Ice climbing
  - Indoor climbing
  - Mountain climbing
    - Alpine climbing
  - Rock climbing
    - Sport climbing
    - Traditional climbing
- Climbing specialist, a racing cyclist who is especially competitive on hills

== Other uses ==
- Climb (aeronautics), an aviation term

- Step climb
- Top of climb
- Rate of climb
- Angle of climb

- Dislocation climb, a materials science term
- Social climbing

== See also ==
- Climber (disambiguation)
- Limb (disambiguation)
