= Limbe =

Limbe or Limbé may refer to:

== Places ==
- Limbe, Cameroon, a seaside city in the South West Region of Cameroon
- Limbé Arrondissement, an arrondissement in the Nord department of Haiti
  - Limbé, Nord, a commune in the Limbé Arrondissement
- Rivière du Limbè, a river in Haiti
- Limbe, Malawi, a town

== Schools ==
- Government High School (GHS) Limbe, Cameroon
- Government Bilingual High School Limbe, Cameroon

== Other uses ==
- Limbe (instrument), a type of flute in traditional Mongolian music – see List of Mongolian musical instruments

== See also ==
- Limb (disambiguation)
