= Adjunct professor =

Academic title

An adjunct professor is a type of academic appointment in higher education who does not work full-time at the establishment. The terms of this appointment and the job security of the tenure vary in different parts of the world, but the term is generally agreed to mean a bona-fide part-time faculty member in an adjunct position at an institution of higher education.

== Terminology ==
In Australia, an adjunct professor is the highest academic rank at university, Level E. Adjunct professor title holders are assessed based on metrics, research, publications, teaching and standing. An adjunct professor may also be called an adjunct lecturer, an adjunct instructor, or adjunct faculty. Collectively, they may be referred to as contingent academic labor. The rank of sessional lecturer in Canadian universities is similar to the US concept.

== Americas ==
In the United States, an adjunct is, in most cases, a non-tenure-track faculty member. However, it can also be a scholar or teacher whose primary employer is not the school or department with which they have adjunct status. Adjunct professors make up the majority of instructors in higher education (post-secondary) institutions in the US. In 2025, the AAUP reported that 70% of faculty members teaching in US colleges were in non-tenure track positions. As with other part-time workers, they are paid less than full-time professors and do not receive employee benefits such as health insurance or an office. In most cases, adjunct professors in the US need a master's degree but in some cases only require a bachelor's degree and relevant experience. However, over a third have a doctoral degree. In many universities, the title "adjunct professor" (or variations thereof, such as "adjunct associate professor") implies a PhD or other terminal degree; those with a master's or bachelor's degree may receive the title of "adjunct lecturer".

In Canada, adjunct professors are often nominated in recognition of active involvement with the appointing institution. At the same time, they are employed by the government, industry, a profession, or another institution. The term "course lecturer," rather than "adjunct," is used if the appointment is strictly to teach one or more courses. In contrast, the US uses this title for all instructors.

In Argentina and Brazil, the designation professor adjunto implies stable employment.

== Europe ==
In Portugal, the designation professor adjunto implies stable full-time employment in a polytechnic university.

In parts of Spain, the term professor adjunto refers to a non-tenured position.

In Hungary, there exists a similar term adjunktus, as well as adiunkt in Poland, although only the term is similar, as adjunktus in Hungarian means full-time employed assistant professor, not a bona fide lecturer.

In Finland, the Docents' Union of Finland recommend the term adjunct professor or associate professor in English as a translation of the title of docent. However, the official translation used by the universities granting the title is "Title of Docent". A docentship should be regarded as an educational title not connected with the employment rank as such, rather an assurance of the level of expertise, to enable the person to advance further in their academic career. The rank of a docent entitles scientists to be principal investigators, lead research groups, and act as the supervisors of doctoral students.

Some universities in The Netherlands have adjunct professors, where the title applies to the highest ranking variant of associate professor, thus having quite a distinct interpretation from the American use of the term.

In Italy, the term adjunct professor is used to translate the title of Professore a contratto.

In France, the term adjunct professor refers to Professeur vacataire.

In Germany, the term adjunct professor translates to the title of außerplanmäßiger Professor and is abbreviated apl. Prof. or Titularprofessor.

In Switzerland, the terme adjunct professor refers to Professeur titulaire (French) or Titularprofessor (German), granted usually to someone as a mark of academic distinction, but the rights, duties, and institutional status attached to that title vary from one university to another.

== South Asia ==
In Bangladesh, private universities follow the title adjunct professor or adjunct associate professor to imply non-tenure faculty members.

In Pakistan, adjunct (assistant/associate) professors are also considered as non-regular faculty members, and usually, posts are given to Pakistani overseas scientists under a faculty development program.

== Southeast Asia and Oceania ==
In Australia, the term adjunct is reserved for academics and researchers from outside the university who have a close association with the university, e.g., through supervision of PhD students, recognized by a title reflective of their rank and standing (adjunct lecturer, senior lecturer, associate professor or professor).

In Thailand, adjunct (assistant/associate) professors are considered "non-regular officers".
