= Area forecast =

Defunct aviation weather product

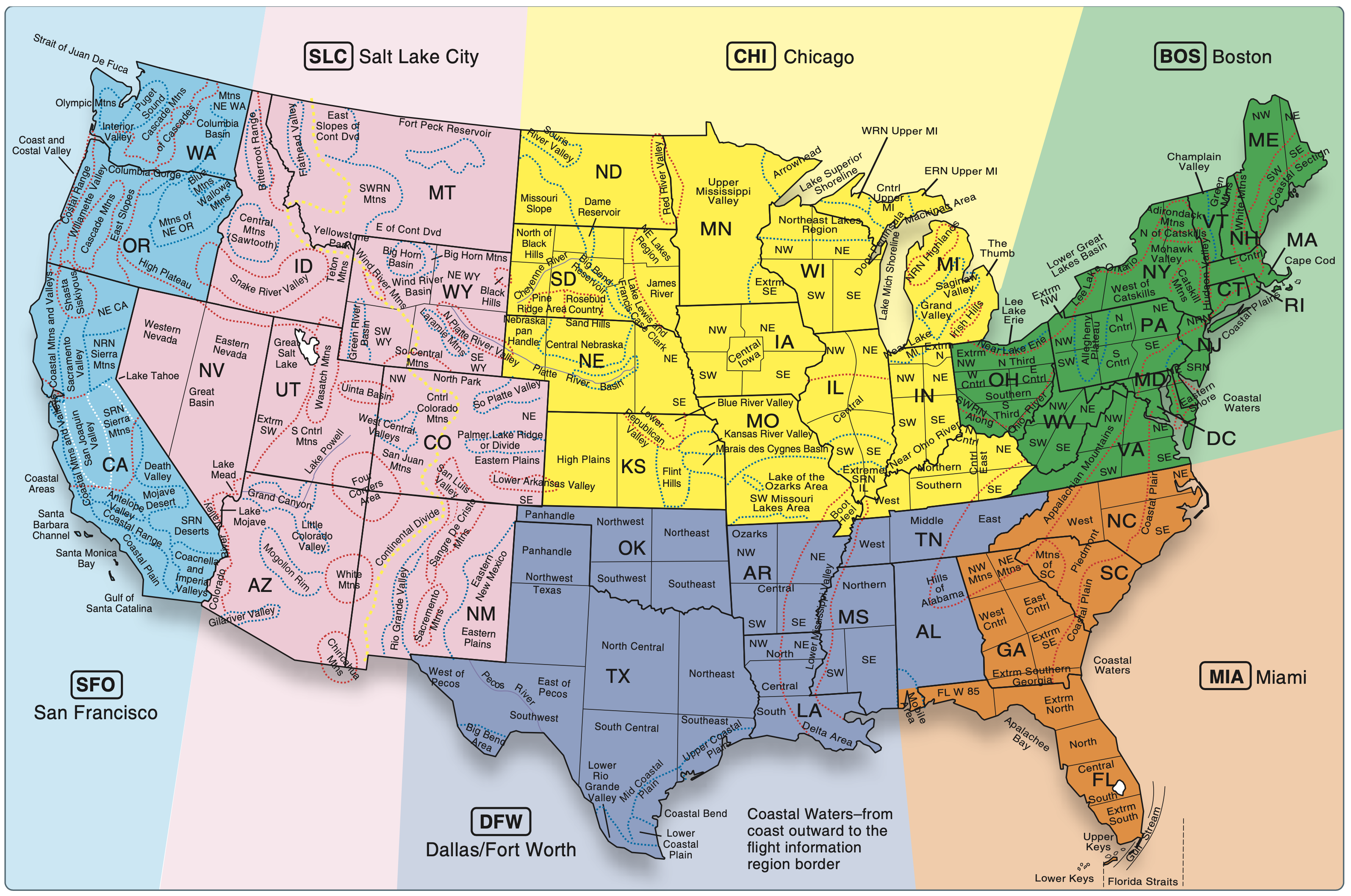
Area forecast divides the conterminous 48 states into 6 regions, with each region centered at: SFO, SLC, CHI, DFW, BOS, and MIA.

An Aviation Area Forecast (FA or ARFOR) was a message product of the National Weather Service (NWS) in the United States. It has been replaced by Graphic Area Forecasts, or GFA, in 2017.

There are also weather charts forecast like SIGWX. FA encompasses the weather conditions over a large regional area and is considered one of the better sources of information for en-route weather. It is also beneficial in verifying airport conditions at airports that do not have terminal aerodrome forecasts. FA's were issued three times daily in all 48 contiguous states of the United States, and modified as required. The NWS offices also issued FA's for Alaska and Hawaii, but Alaska used a slightly different format.

== Description ==
Area forecasts (FA's) were issued 3 times daily, valid for 18 hours (12-hour forecast, plus 6-hour categorical outlook), and cover an area the size of several states

Description of content:

- Visibility is always stated in statute miles (SM)
- Times are issued in UTC (Coordinated Universal Time)
- Comprise four sections
  - a. A communications and header section
    - i. Issue time of forecast
    - ii. Valid times of the synopsis and the visual flight rules (VFR) CLOUDS/WX sections
    - iii. Area of coverage
  - b. A precautionary statement section
    - i. Warns users to check the AIRMET section for IFR and/or mountain obscuration
    - ii. Describes the hazards associated with all thunderstorm
    - iii. Reminds users that all altitudes are given in MSL, unless noted as AGL or CIG (ceiling)
  - c. A synopsis section
    - i. Brief summary of the location and movement of fronts, pressure systems and circulation patterns for an 18-hour period
    - ii. References to low ceilings, reduced visibility and/or strong winds may be included
  - d. A VFR CLOUDS/WX section
    - i. Contains a 12-hour specific forecast, followed by a 6-hour categorical outlook
    - ii. Broken down into geographical areas, and/or states
    - iii. Describes cloud and weather affecting VFR flight operations, including precipitation, thunderstorms, and sustained surface winds 20 Kts or greater. Also includes visibility when the forecast to visibility is between 3 and 6 SM and/or obstructions to visibility

Some abbreviations that are used in FA's include:

- OCNL Occasional >50% chance for <1/2 of the forecast period
- ISOLD Isolated Single cells
- WDLY SCT Widely scattered <25% of the area affected
- SCT Scattered Areas of 25% to 54% of the area affected
- NMRS Numerous >55% of the area affected
- WDSPRD Widespread >55% of the area affected

Status of an FA can be:

- AMD Amended Includes AIRMETs, SIGMETs, and Convective SIGMETs
- COR Corrected
- RTD Delayed
