= Celeste Saulo =

Argentine climatologist

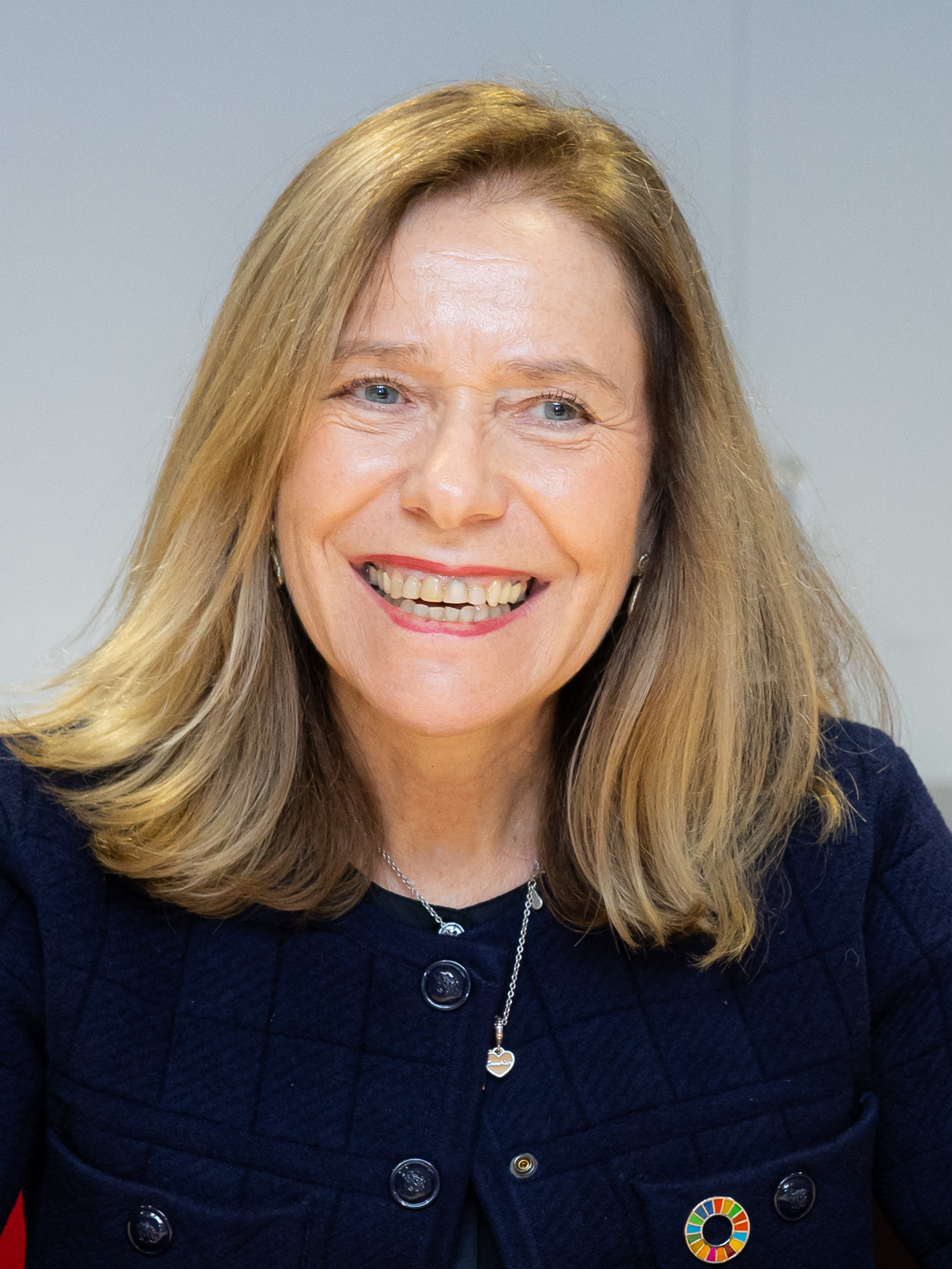
- Saulo in 2025

Secretary-General of the World Meteorological Organization
- Incumbent
- Assumed office 1 January 2024
- Preceded by: Petteri Taalas

Director of the Servicio Meteorológico Nacional
- Incumbent
- Assumed office 8 July 2014
- President: Cristina Fernández de Kirchner (2014–2015); Mauricio Macri (2015–2019); Alberto Fernández (2019–2023)
- Preceded by: Héctor Horacio Ciappesoni

Personal details
- Born: Andrea Celeste Saulo; 6 May 1964 (age 62) Buenos Aires, Argentina
- Education: University of Buenos Aires
- Occupation: Meteorologist, educator, UN agency head.
- Website: wmo.int

Andrea Celeste Saulo (born 6 May 1964) is an Argentine meteorologist and educator who became Secretary-General of the World Meteorological Organization (WMO) in 2024. She served as director of the Servicio Meteorológico Nacional (SMN) from 2014, and she was the first vice president of the World Meteorological Organization in 2018. She was the first woman to hold WMO offices.

== Biography ==
Celeste Saulo was born in Buenos Aires on 6 May 1964. She was brought up in the capital by her father who was a doctor and her mother who was an administrator. She earned a licentiate in meteorological sciences at the University of Buenos Aires (UBA), and a doctorate in atmospheric sciences there in 1996.

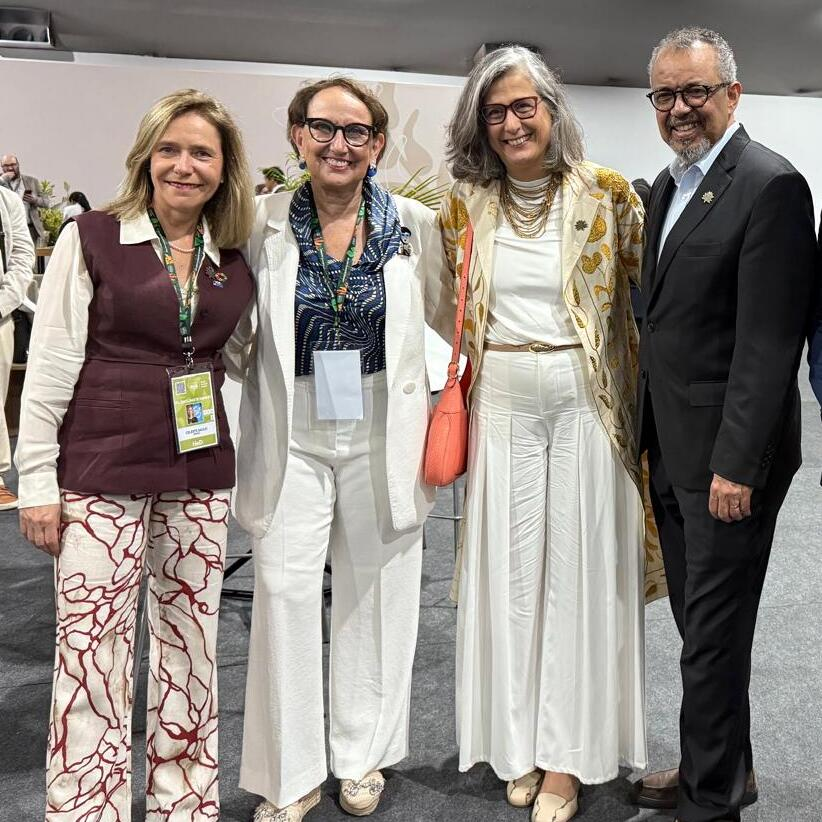
Celeste Saulo with UNCTAD's Rebeca Grynspan, UN-Habitat's Anacláudia Rossbach and WHO's Tedros Adhanom Ghebreyesus at COP30

She has been a researcher at UBA since 2000, and is a profesora asociada at its Faculty of Exact and Natural Sciences. Since 2002, she has been a researcher at the Sea and Atmosphere Research Center, a joint venture of UBA and the National Scientific and Technical Research Council (CONICET). She has been an SMN researcher since 2016. Her specialties are atmospheric modeling, the representation of uncertainty in forecasts, and the generation of products oriented to decision making.

She was the director of undergraduate and doctoral theses, director of doctoral and post-doctoral scholarships, and a doctoral thesis juror at UBA. She was elected to two consecutive terms as director of the Department of Atmospheric and Ocean Sciences.

She has been a member of the World Meteorological Research Program's scientific steering committee since 2011, and joined WMO's executive council in 2015.

In July 2014, she was appointed director of SMN. In April 2018, the WMO appointed her second vice president, and interim first vice president to fill the vacancy left by Rob Varley. She was elected first vice president the following year.

In 2023 she was granted the Konex Award Merit Diploma for her work in Earth and Atmospheric Sciences in the last decade.

In 2024 she became the Secretary-General of the World Meteorological Organization. She had been elected by the Nineteenth World Meteorological Congress to serve for four years. She was the World Meteorological Organization's first female and South American Secretary-General.

== Private life ==
Saulo is married with two children.

== Selected publications ==
- 2000: Assessment of a regional climate for South America: a dynamical downscaling approach
- 2017: Joint Assessment of Soil Moisture Indicators (JASMIN) for southeastern South America
