= Flight planning =

Process of producing a flight plan

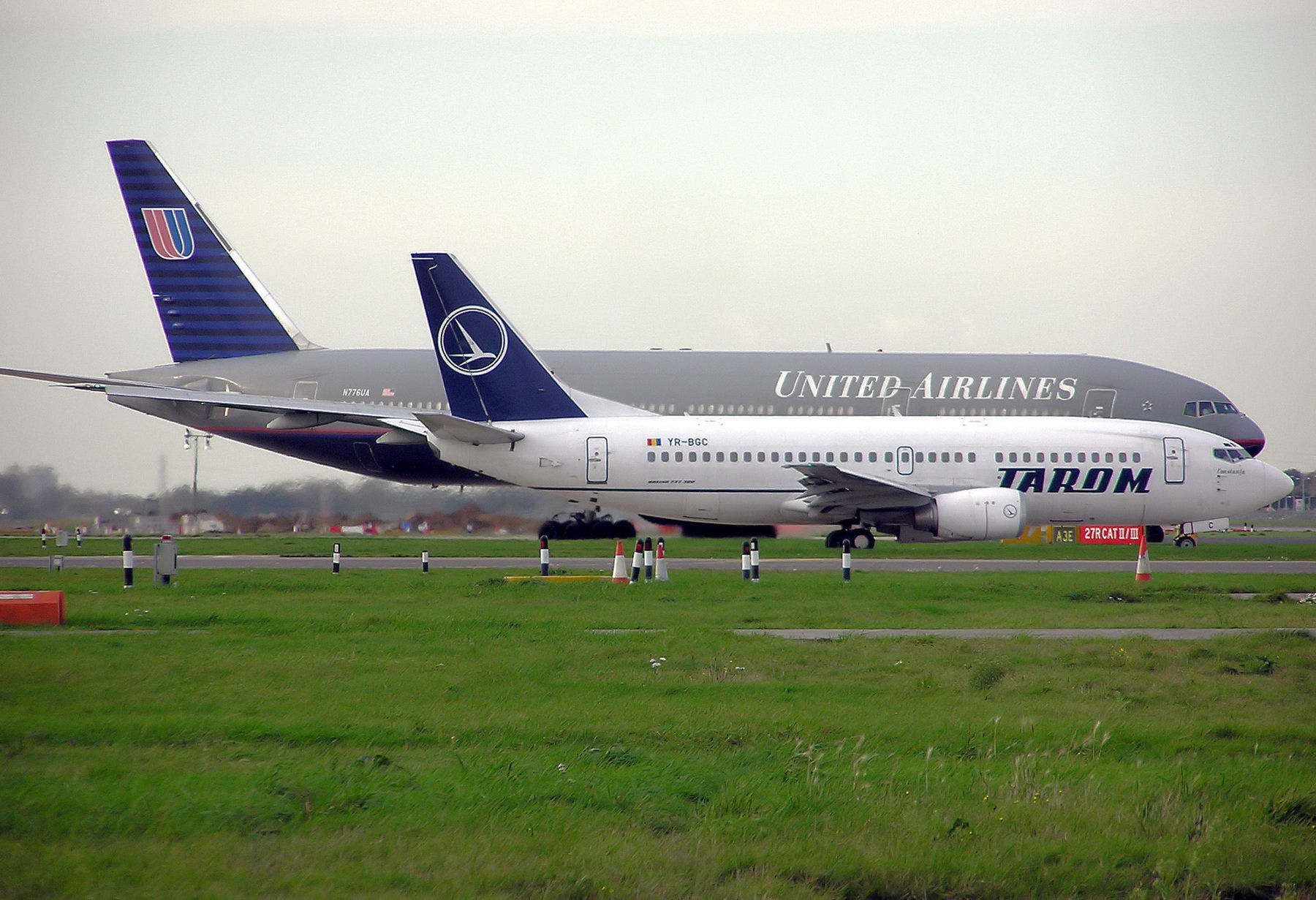
A Tarom Boeing 737-300 and United Airlines Boeing 777-200 taxiing to depart London Heathrow Airport.

Flight planning is the process of producing a flight plan to describe a proposed aircraft flight. It involves two safety-critical aspects: fuel calculation, to ensure that the aircraft can safely reach the destination, and compliance with air traffic control requirements, to minimise the risk of midair collision. In addition, flight planners normally wish to minimise flight cost through the appropriate choice of route, height, and speed, and by loading the minimum necessary fuel on board. Air Traffic Services (ATS) use the completed flight plan for separation of aircraft in air traffic management services, including tracking and finding lost aircraft, during search and rescue (SAR) missions. Flight planning typically includes route selection, fuel calculation, alternate aerodrome planning, weight and balance considerations, and an assessment of meteorological conditions.

Flight planning requires accurate weather forecasts so that fuel consumption calculations can account for the fuel consumption effects of head or tail winds and air temperature. Safety regulations require aircraft to carry fuel beyond the minimum needed to fly from origin to destination, allowing for unforeseen circumstances or for diversion to another airport if the planned destination becomes unavailable. Furthermore, under the supervision of air traffic control, aircraft flying in controlled airspace must follow predetermined routes known as airways (at least where they have been defined), even if such routes are not as economical as a more direct flight. Within these airways, aircraft must maintain flight levels, specified altitudes usually separated vertically by 1,000 or 2,000 ft (300 or 610 m), depending on the route being flown and the direction of travel. When aircraft with only two engines are flying long distances across oceans, deserts, or other areas with no airports, they have to satisfy additional ETOPS safety rules to ensure they can reach an emergency airport if one engine fails.

Producing an accurate optimised flight plan requires millions of calculations, so commercial flight planning systems make extensive use of computers (an approximate unoptimised flight plan can be produced using an E6-B flight computer and a map in an hour or so, but more allowance must be made for unforeseen circumstances). When computer flight planning replaced manual flight planning for eastbound flights across the North Atlantic, the average fuel consumption was reduced by about 450 kg (1,000 lb) per flight, and the average flight times were reduced by about 5 minutes per flight. Some commercial airlines have their own internal flight planning system, while others employ the services of external planners.

A licensed flight dispatcher or flight operations officer is required by law to carry out flight planning and flight watch tasks in many commercial operating environments (e.g., US FAR §121, Canadian regulations). These regulations vary by country but more and more countries require their airline operators to employ such personnel.

== Overview and basic terminology ==
A flight planning system may need to produce more than one flight plan for a single flight:

- summary plan for air traffic control (in FAA and/or ICAO format)
- summary plan for direct download into an onboard flight management system
- detailed plan for use by pilots

The basic purpose of a flight planning system is to calculate how much trip fuel is needed in the air navigation process by an aircraft when flying from an origin airport to a destination airport. Aircraft must also carry some reserve fuel to allow for unforeseen circumstances, such as an inaccurate weather forecast, or air traffic control requiring an aircraft to fly at a lower-than-optimal altitude due to airway congestion, or the addition of last-minute passengers whose weight was not accounted for when the flight plan was prepared. The way in which reserve fuel is determined varies greatly, depending on airline and locality. The most common methods are:

- US domestic operations conducted under Instrument Flight Rules: enough fuel to fly to the first point of intended landing, then fly to an alternate airport (if weather conditions require an alternate airport), then for 45 minutes thereafter at normal cruising speed
- percentage of time: typically 10% (i.e., a 10-hour flight needs enough reserve to fly for another hour)
- percentage of fuel: typically 5% (i.e., a flight requiring 20,000 kg of fuel needs a reserve of 1,000 kg)

Except for some US domestic flights, a flight plan normally has an alternate airport as well as a destination airport. The alternate airport is for use in case the destination airport becomes unusable while the flight is in progress (due to weather conditions, a strike, a crash, terrorist activity, etc.). This means that when the aircraft gets near the destination airport, it must still have enough alternate fuel and alternate reserve available to fly on to the alternate airport. Since the aircraft is not expected at the alternate airport, it must also have enough holding fuel to circle for a while (typically 30 minutes) near the alternate airport while a landing slot is found. United States domestic flights are not required to have sufficient fuel to proceed to an alternate airport when the weather at the destination is forecast to be better than 2,000-foot (610 m) ceilings and 3 statute miles of visibility; however, the 45-minute reserve at normal cruising speed still applies.

It is often considered a good idea to have the alternate some distance away from the destination (e.g., 185 km (100 nmi; 115 mi)) so that bad weather is unlikely to close both the destination and the alternate; distances of up to 960 kilometres (520 nmi; 600 mi) are not unknown. In some cases the destination airport may be so remote (e.g., a Pacific island) that there is no feasible alternate airport; in such a situation an airline may instead include enough fuel to circle for 2 hours near the destination, in the hope that the airport will become available again within that time.

There is often more than one possible route between two airports. Subject to safety requirements, commercial airlines generally wish to minimise costs by appropriate choice of route, speed, and height.

Various names are given to weights associated with an aircraft and/or the total weight of the aircraft at various stages.

- Payload is the total weight of the passengers, their luggage, and any cargo. A commercial airline makes its money by charging to carry payload.
- Operating weight empty is the basic weight of the aircraft when ready for operation, including crew but excluding any payload or usable fuel.
- Zero fuel weight is the sum of operating weight empty and payload—that is, the laden weight of an aircraft, excluding any usable fuel.
- Ramp weight is the weight of an aircraft at the terminal building when ready for departure. This includes the zero fuel weight and all required fuel.
- Brake release weight is the weight of an aircraft at the start of a runway, just prior to brake release for takeoff. This is the ramp weight minus any fuel used for taxiing. Major airports may have runways that are about 2 miles (3 km) long, so merely taxiing from the terminal to the end of the runway might consume up to a ton of fuel. After taxiing, the pilot lines up the aircraft with the runway and puts the brakes on. On receiving takeoff clearance, the pilot throttles up the engines and releases the brakes to start accelerating along the runway in preparation for taking off.
- Takeoff weight is the weight of an aircraft as it takes off partway along a runway. Few flight planning systems calculate the actual takeoff weight; instead, the fuel used for taking off is counted as part of the fuel used for climbing up to the normal cruise height.
- Landing weight is the weight of an aircraft as it lands at the destination. This is the brake release weight minus the trip fuel burned. It includes the zero fuel weight, unusable fuel, and all alternate, holding, and reserve fuel.

When twin-engine aircraft are flying across oceans, deserts, and the like, the route must be carefully planned so that the aircraft can always reach an airport, even if one engine fails. The applicable rules are known as ETOPS (ExTended range OPerationS). The general reliability of the particular type of aircraft and its engines and the maintenance quality of the airline are taken into account when specifying how long such an aircraft may fly with only one engine operating (typically 1–3 hours).

Flight planning systems must be able to cope with aircraft flying below sea level, which will often result in a negative altitude. For example, Amsterdam Schiphol Airport has an elevation of −3 metres. The surface of the Dead Sea is 417 metres below sea level, so low-level flights in this vicinity can be well below sea level.

== Units of measurement ==
Flight plans mix metric and non-metric units of measurement. The particular units used may vary by aircraft, airline, and location across a flight.

Since 1979, the International Civil Aviation Organization (ICAO) has recommended a unification of units of measurement within aviation based on the International System of Units (SI). Since 2010, ICAO recommends using:

- Kilometers per hour (km/h) for speed during travel.
- Meters per second (m/s) for wind speed during landing.
- Kilometers (km) for distance.
- Meters (m) for elevation.

However, a termination date for completion of metrication has not been established. While SI units technically are preferred, various non-SI units are still in widespread use within commercial aviation:

- Knots (kn) for speed.
- Nautical mile (nm) for distance.
- Foot (ft) for elevation.

=== Distance units ===
Distances are nearly always measured in nautical miles, as calculated at a height of 32,000 feet (9,800 m), compensated for the fact that the earth is an oblate spheroid rather than a perfect sphere. Aviation charts always show distances as rounded to the nearest nautical mile, and these are the distances that are shown on a flight plan. Flight planning systems may need to use the unrounded values in their internal calculations for improved accuracy.

=== Fuel units ===
Fuel measurement will vary on the gauges fitted to a particular aircraft. The most common unit of fuel measurement is kilograms; other possible measures include pounds, UK gallons, US gallons, and litres. When fuel is measured by weight, the specific gravity of the fuel used is taken into account when checking tank capacity.

There has been at least one occasion on which an aircraft ran out of fuel due to an error in converting between kilograms and pounds. In this particular case the flight crew managed to glide to a nearby runway and land safely (the runway was one of two at a former airport then being used as a dragstrip).

Many airlines request that fuel quantities be rounded to a multiple of 10 or 100 units. This can cause some interesting rounding problems, especially when subtotals are involved. Safety issues must also be considered when deciding whether to round up or down.

=== Height units ===
The altitude of an aircraft is based on the use of a pressure altimeter (see flight level for more detail). The heights quoted here are thus the nominal heights under standard conditions of temperature and pressure rather than the actual heights. All aircraft operating on flight levels calibrate altimeters to the same standard setting regardless of the actual sea level pressure, so little risk of collision arises.

In most areas, height is reported as a multiple of 100 feet (30 m), i.e. A025 is nominally 2,500 feet (760 m). When cruising at higher altitudes aircraft adopt flight levels (FLs). Flight levels are altitudes corrected and calibrated against the International Standard Atmosphere (ISA). These are expressed as a three-figure group e.g., FL320 is 32,000 ft (9,800 m) ISA.

In most areas, the vertical separation between aircraft is either 1,000 or 2,000 ft (300 or 610 m).

In Russia, China and some neighbouring areas, altitudes are measured in metres. The vertical separation between aircraft is either 300 metres or 600 metres (about 1.6% less than 1,000 or 2,000 feet).

Until 1999, the vertical separation between aircraft flying at high altitudes on the same airway was 2,000 feet (610 m). Since then there has been a phased introduction around the world of reduced vertical separation minimum (RVSM). This cuts the vertical separation to 1,000 feet (300 m) between flight levels 290 and 410 (the exact limits vary slightly from place to place). Since most jet aircraft operate between these heights, this measure effectively doubles the available airway capacity. To use RVSM, aircraft must have certified altimeters, and autopilots must meet more accurate standards.

=== Speed units ===
Aircraft cruising at lower altitudes normally use knots as the primary speed unit, while aircraft that are higher (above Mach Crossover Altitude) normally use Mach number as the primary speed unit, though flight plans often include the equivalent speed in knots as well (the conversion includes allowance for temperature and height). In a flight plan, a Mach number of "Point 82" means that the aircraft is travelling at 0.820 (82%) of the speed of sound.

The widespread use of global positioning systems (GPS) allows cockpit navigation systems to provide air speed and ground speed more or less directly.

Another method of obtaining speed and position is the inertial navigation system (INS), which keeps track of a vehicle's acceleration using gyroscopes and linear accelerometers; this information can then be integrated in time to obtain speed and position, as long as the INS was properly calibrated before departure. INS has been present in civil aviation for a few decades and is mostly used in medium to large aircraft as the system is fairly complex.

If neither GPS or INS is used, the following steps are required to obtain speed information:

- An airspeed indicator is used to measure indicated airspeed (IAS) in knots.
- IAS is converted to calibrated airspeed (CAS) using an aircraft-specific correction table.
- CAS is converted to equivalent airspeed (EAS) by allowing for compressibility effects.
- EAS is converted to true airspeed (TAS) by allowing for density altitude (i.e., height and temperature).
- TAS is converted to ground speed by allowing for any head or tail wind.

=== Mass units ===
The weight of an aircraft is most commonly measured in kilograms, but may sometimes be measured in pounds, especially if the fuel gauges are calibrated in pounds or gallons. Many airlines request that weights be rounded to a multiple of 10 or 100 units. Great care is needed when rounding to ensure that physical constraints are not exceeded.

When chatting informally about a flight plan, approximate weights of fuel and/or aircraft may be referred to in tons. This "ton" is generally either a metric tonne or a UK long ton, which differ by less than 2%, or a short ton, which is about 10% less.

== Describing a route ==
A route is a description of the path followed by an aircraft when flying between airports. Most commercial flights will travel from one airport to another, but private aircraft, commercial sightseeing tours, and military aircraft may do a circular or out-and-back trip and land at the same airport from which they took off.

=== Components ===
Aircraft fly on airways under the direction of air traffic control. An airway has no physical existence, but can be thought of as a motorway in the sky. On an ordinary motorway, cars use different lanes to avoid collisions, while on an airway, aircraft fly at different flight levels to avoid collisions. One can often see planes passing directly above or below one's own. Charts showing airways are published and are usually updated every 4 weeks, coinciding with the AIRAC cycle. AIRAC (Aeronautical Information Regulation and Control) occurs every fourth Thursday, when every country publishes its changes, which are usually to airways.

Each airway starts and finishes at a waypoint, and may contain some intermediate waypoints as well. Waypoints use five letters (e.g., PILOX), and those that double as non-directional beacons use three or two (TNN, WK). Airways may cross or join at a waypoint, so an aircraft can change from one airway to another at such points. A complete route between airports often uses several airways. Where there is no suitable airway between two waypoints, and using airways would result in a somewhat roundabout route, air traffic control may allow a direct waypoint-to-waypoint routing, which does not use an airway (often abbreviated in flight plans as "DCT").

Most waypoints are classified as compulsory reporting points; that is, the pilot (or the onboard flight management system) reports the aircraft's position to air traffic control as the aircraft passes a waypoint. There are two main types of waypoints:

- A named waypoint appears on aviation charts with a known latitude and longitude. Such waypoints over land often have an associated radio beacon so that pilots can more easily check where they are. Useful named waypoints are always on one or more airways.
- A geographic waypoint is a temporary position used in a flight plan, usually in an area where there are no named waypoints (e.g., most oceans in the Southern Hemisphere). Air traffic control require that geographic waypoints have latitudes and longitudes that are a whole number of degrees.

Note that airways do not connect directly to airports.

- After takeoff, an aircraft follows a departure procedure (standard instrument departure, or SID), which defines a pathway from an airport runway to a waypoint on an airway, so that the aircraft can join the airway system in a controlled manner. Most of the climb portion of a flight will take place on the SID.
- Before landing, an aircraft follows an arrival procedure (standard terminal arrival route, or STAR), which defines a pathway from a waypoint on an airway to an airport runway, so that the aircraft can leave the airway system in a controlled manner. Much of the descent portion of a flight will take place on a STAR.

Airline routes between Los Angeles and Tokyo approximately follow a direct great circle route (top), but use the jet stream (bottom) when heading eastward (Tokyo to Los Angeles)

Special routes known as ocean tracks are used across some oceans, mainly in the Northern Hemisphere, to increase traffic capacity on busy routes. Unlike ordinary airways, which change infrequently, ocean tracks change twice a day, so as to take advantage of favourable winds. Flights going with the jet stream may be an hour shorter than those going against it. Ocean tracks may start and finish about 100 miles offshore at named waypoints, to which a number of airways connect. Tracks across northern oceans are suitable for east–west or west–east flights, which constitute the bulk of the traffic in these areas.

=== Complete routes ===
There are a number of ways of constructing a route. All scenarios using airways use SIDs and STARs for departure and arrival. Any mention of airways might include a very small number of "direct" segments to allow for situations when there are no convenient airway junctions. In some cases, political considerations may influence the choice of route (e.g., aircraft from one country cannot overfly some other country).

- Airway(s) from origin to destination. Most flights over land fall into this category.
- Airway(s) from origin to an ocean edge, then an ocean track, then airway(s) from ocean edge to destination. Most flights over northern oceans fall into this category.
- Airway(s) from origin to an ocean edge, then a free-flight area across an ocean, then airway(s) from ocean edge to destination. Most flights over southern oceans fall into this category.
- Free-flight area from origin to destination. This is a relatively uncommon situation for commercial flights.

Even in a free-flight area, air traffic control still requires a position report about once an hour. Flight planning systems organise this by inserting geographic waypoints at suitable intervals. For a jet aircraft, these intervals are 10 degrees of longitude for eastbound or westbound flights and 5 degrees of latitude for northbound or southbound flights. In free-flight areas, commercial aircraft normally follow a least-time-track so as to use as little time and fuel as possible. A great circle route would have the shortest ground distance, but is unlikely to have the shortest air distance, due to the effect of head or tail winds. A flight planning system may have to perform significant analysis to determine a good free-flight route.

== Fuel calculation ==
Calculation of fuel requirements (especially trip fuel and reserve fuel) is the most safety-critical aspect of flight planning. This calculation is somewhat complicated:

- Rate of fuel burn depends on ambient temperature, aircraft speed, and aircraft altitude, none of which are entirely predictable.
- Rate of fuel burn also depends on airplane weight, which changes as fuel is burned.
- Some iteration is generally required due to the need to calculate interdependent values. For instance, reserve fuel is often calculated as a percentage of trip fuel, but trip fuel cannot be calculated until the total weight of the aircraft is known, and this includes the weight of the reserve fuel.

=== Considerations ===
Fuel calculation must take many factors into account.

- Weather forecasts

The air temperature affects the efficiency/fuel consumption of aircraft engines. The wind may provide a head- or tailwind component, which in turn will increase or decrease the fuel consumption by increasing or decreasing the air distance to be flown.

By agreement with the International Civil Aviation Organization, there are two national weather centres - in the United States, the National Oceanic and Atmospheric Administration, and in the United Kingdom, the Met Office - which provide worldwide weather forecasts for civil aviation in a format known as GRIB weather. These forecasts are generally issued every 6 hours and cover the subsequent 36 hours. Each 6-hour forecast covers the whole world using grid points located at intervals of 75 nautical miles (139 km) or less. At each grid point, the wind speed, wind direction, air temperature is supplied at nine different heights between 4,500 and 55,000 feet (1,400 and 16,800 m).

Aircraft seldom fly exactly through weather gridpoints or at the exact heights at which weather predictions are available, so some form of horizontal and vertical interpolation is generally needed. For 75-nautical-mile (139 km) intervals, linear interpolation is satisfactory. The GRIB format superseded the earlier ADF format in 1998–99. The ADF format used 300-nautical-mile (560 km) intervals; this interval was large enough to miss some storms completely, so calculations using ADF-predicted weather were often not as accurate as those that can be produced using GRIB-predicted weather.

- Routes and flight levels

The particular route to be flown determines the ground distance to cover, while winds on that route determine the air distance to be flown. Each inter-waypoint portion of an airway may have different rules as to which flight levels may be used. Total aircraft weight at any point determines the highest flight level which can be used. Cruising at a higher flight level generally requires less fuel than at a lower flight level, but extra climb fuel may be needed to get up to the higher flight level (it is this extra climb fuel and the different fuel consumption rate that cause discontinuities).

- Physical constraints

Almost all the weights mentioned above in "Overview and basic terminology" may be subject to minimum and/or maximum values. Due to stress on the wheels and undercarriage when landing, the maximum safe landing weight may be considerably less than the maximum safe brake-release weight. In such cases, an aircraft that encounters some emergency and has to land immediately after taking off may have to circle for a while to use up fuel, or else jettison some fuel, or else land immediately and risk having the undercarriage collapse.

Further, the fuel tanks have a maximum capacity. On some occasions, commercial flight planning systems find that an impossible flight plan has been requested. The aircraft cannot possibly reach the intended destination, even with no cargo or passengers, since the fuel tanks are not big enough to hold the amount of fuel needed; it would appear that some airlines are over-optimistic at times, perhaps hoping for a (very) strong tailwind.

- Fuel consumption rate

The rate of fuel consumption for aircraft engines depends on the air temperature, height as measured by air pressure, aircraft weight, aircraft speed relative to the air, and any increased consumption as compared with brand-new engines due to engine age and/or poor maintenance (an airline can estimate this degradation by comparing actual with predicted fuel burn). Note that a large aircraft, such as a jumbo jet, may burn up to 80 tons of fuel on a 10-hour flight, so there is a substantial weight change during the flight.

=== Calculation ===
The weight of fuel forms a significant part of the total weight of an aircraft, so any fuel calculation must take into account the weight of any fuel not yet burned. Instead of trying to predict the fuel load not yet burned, a flight planning system can handle this situation by working backward along the route, starting at the alternate, going back to the destination, and then going back waypoint by waypoint to the origin.

A more detailed outline of the calculation follows. Several (possibly many) iterations are usually required, either to calculate interdependent values such as reserve fuel and trip fuel, or to cope with situations where some physical constraint has been exceeded. In the latter case it is usually necessary to reduce the payload (less cargo or fewer passengers). Some flight planning systems use elaborate systems of approximate equations to simultaneously estimate all the changes required; this can greatly reduce the number of iterations needed.

If an aircraft lands at the alternate, in the worst case it can be assumed to have no fuel left (in practice there will be enough reserve fuel left to at least taxi off the runway). Hence a flight planning system can calculate alternate holding fuel on the basis that the final aircraft weight is the zero fuel weight. Since the aircraft is circling while holding, there is no need to take wind into account for this or any other holding calculation.

For the flight from destination to alternate, a flight planning system can calculate alternate trip fuel and alternate reserve fuel on the basis that the aircraft weight on reaching the alternate is zero fuel weight plus alternate holding.

A flight planning system can then calculate any destination holding on the basis that the final aircraft weight is zero fuel weight plus alternate holding plus alternate fuel plus alternate reserve.

For the flight from origin to destination, the weight on arrival at the destination can be taken as zero fuel weight plus alternate holding plus alternate fuel plus alternate reserve plus destination holding. A flight planning system can then work back along the route, calculating the trip fuel and reserve fuel one waypoint at a time, with the fuel required for each inter-waypoint segment forming part of the aircraft weight for the next segment to be calculated.

At each stage and/or at the end of the calculation, a flight planning system must carry out checks to ensure that physical constraints (e.g., maximum tank capacity) have not been exceeded. Problems mean that either the aircraft weight must be reduced in some way or the calculation must be abandoned.

An alternative approach to fuel calculation is to calculate alternate and holding fuel as above and obtain some estimate of the total trip fuel requirement, either based on previous experience with that route and aircraft type, or by using some approximate formula; neither method can take much account of weather. Calculation can then proceed forward along the route, waypoint by waypoint. On reaching the destination, the actual trip fuel can be compared with the estimated trip fuel, a better estimate made, and the calculation repeated as required.

== Cost reduction ==
Commercial airlines generally wish to keep the cost of a flight as low as possible. There are three main factors that contribute to the cost:

- the amount of fuel needed (to complicate matters, fuel may cost different amounts at different airports),
- actual flying time affects depreciation charges, maintenance schedules, and the like,
- overflight charges are levied by each country the aircraft flies over (notionally to cover air traffic control costs).

Different airlines have different views as to what constitutes a least-cost flight:

- least cost based only on time
- least cost based only on fuel
- least cost based on a balance between fuel and time
- least cost based on fuel costs and time costs and overflight charges

=== Basic improvements ===
For any given route, a flight planning system can reduce cost by finding the most economical speed at any given altitude and by finding the best altitude(s) to use based on the predicted weather. Such local optimisation can be done on a waypoint-by-waypoint basis.

Commercial airlines do not want an aircraft to change altitude too often (among other things, it may make it more difficult for the cabin crew to serve meals), so they often specify some minimum time between optimisation-related flight level changes. To cope with such requirements, a flight planning system must be capable of non-local altitude optimisation by simultaneously taking a number of waypoints into account, along with the fuel costs for any short climbs that may be required.

When there is more than one possible route between the origin and destination airports, the task facing a flight planning system becomes more complicated, since it must now consider many routes in order to find the best available route. Many situations have tens or even hundreds of possible routes, and there are some situations with over 25,000 possible routes (e.g., London to New York with free-flight below the track system). The amount of calculation required to produce an accurate flight plan is so substantial that it is not feasible to examine every possible route in detail. A flight planning system must have some fast way of cutting the number of possibilities down to a manageable number before undertaking a detailed analysis.

=== Reserve reduction ===
From an accountant's viewpoint, the provision of reserve fuel costs money (the fuel needed to carry the hopefully unused reserve fuel). Techniques known variously as reclear, redispatch, or decision point procedure have been developed, which can greatly reduce the amount of reserve fuel needed while still maintaining all required safety standards. These techniques are based on having some specified intermediate airport to which the flight can divert if necessary; in practice such diversions are rare. The use of such techniques can save several tons of fuel on long flights, or it can increase the payload carried by a similar amount.

A reclear flight plan has two destinations. The final destination airport is where the flight is really going to, while the initial destination airport is where the flight will divert to if more fuel is used than expected during the early part of the flight. The waypoint at which the decision is made as to which destination to go to is called the reclear fix or decision point. On reaching this waypoint, the flight crew make a comparison between actual and predicted fuel burn and check how much reserve fuel is available. If there is sufficient reserve fuel, then the flight can continue to the final destination airport; otherwise the aircraft must divert to the initial destination airport.

The initial destination is positioned so that less reserve fuel is needed for a flight from the origin to the initial destination than for a flight from the origin to the final destination. Under normal circumstances, little if any of the reserve fuel is actually used, so when the aircraft reaches the reclear fix it still has (almost) all the original reserve fuel on board, which is enough to cover the flight from the reclear fix to the final destination.

The idea of reclear flights was first published in Boeing Airliner (1977) by Boeing engineers David Arthur and Gary Rose. The original paper contains a lot of magic numbers relating to the optimum position of the reclear fix and so on. These numbers apply only to the specific type of aircraft considered, for a specific reserve percentage, and take no account of the effect of weather. The fuel savings due to reclear depend on three factors:

- The maximum achievable saving depends on the position of the reclear fix. This position cannot be determined theoretically since there are no exact equations for trip fuel and reserve fuel. Even if it could be determined exactly, there may not be a waypoint at the right place.
- One factor identified by Arthur and Rose that helps achieve the maximum possible saving is to have an initial destination positioned so that descent to the initial destination starts immediately after the reclear fix. This is beneficial because it minimises the reserve fuel needed between reclear fix and initial destination, and hence maximises the amount of reserve fuel available at the reclear fix.
- The other factor which is also helpful is the positioning of the initial alternate airport.

== Filing suboptimal plans ==
Despite all the effort taken to optimise flight plans, there are certain circumstances in which it is advantageous to file suboptimal plans. In busy airspace with a number of competing aircraft, the optimum routes and preferred altitudes may be oversubscribed. This problem can be worse in busy periods, such as when everyone wants to arrive at an airport as soon as it opens for the day. If all the aircraft file optimal flight plans then to avoid overloading, air traffic control may refuse permission for some of the flight plans or delay the allocated takeoff slots. To avoid this a suboptimal flight plan can be filed, asking for an inefficiently low altitude or a longer, less congested route.

Once airborne, part of the pilot's job is to fly as efficiently as possible so he/she might then try to convince air traffic control to allow them to fly closer to the optimum route. This might involve requesting a higher flight level than in the plan or asking for a more direct routing. If the controller does not immediately agree, it may be possible to re-request occasionally until they relent. Alternatively, if there has been any bad weather reported in the area, a pilot might request a climb or turn to avoid weather.

Even if the pilot does not manage to revert to the optimal route, the benefits of being allowed to fly may well outweigh the cost of the suboptimal route.

== VFR flights ==
Although VFR flights often do not require filing a flight plan, a certain amount of flight planning remains necessary. The captain has to make sure that there will be enough fuel on board for the trip and sufficient reserve fuel for unforeseen circumstances. Weight and centre of gravity must remain within their limits during the whole flight. The captain must prepare an alternate flight plan for when landing at the original destination is not possible.

In Canada, however, the regulations state that "... no pilot-in-command shall operate an aircraft in VFR flight unless a VFR flight plan or a VFR flight itinerary has been filed, except where the flight is conducted within 25 NM of the departure aerodrome."

== Additional features ==
Over and above the various cost-reduction measures mentioned above, flight planning systems may offer extra features to help attract and retain customers:

- Other routes
  While a flight plan is produced for a specific route, flight dispatchers may wish to consider alternative routes. A flight planning system may produce summaries for, say, the next 4 best routes, showing zero fuel weight and total fuel for each possibility.
- Reclear selection
  There may be several possible reclear fixes and initial destinations, and which one is best depends on the weather and the zero fuel weight. A flight planning system can analyse each possibility and select whichever is best for this particular flight.
- What-if summaries
  On congested routes, air traffic control may require that an aircraft fly lower or higher than optimum. The total weight of passengers and cargo might not be known at the time the flight plan is prepared. To allow for these situations a flight planning system may produce summaries showing how much fuel would be needed if the aircraft is a little lighter or heavier, or if it is flying higher or lower than planned. These summaries allow flight dispatchers and pilots to check if there is enough reserve fuel to cope with a different scenario.
- Fuel tank distribution
  Most commercial aircraft have more than one fuel tank, and an aircraft manufacturer may provide rules as to how much fuel to load into each tank so as to avoid affecting the aircraft centre of gravity. The rules depend on how much fuel is to be loaded, and there may be different sets of rules for different total amounts of fuel. A flight planning system may follow these rules and produce a report showing how much fuel is to be loaded into each tank.
- Tankering fuel
  When aviation fuel prices differ between airports, it can be worth putting in more fuel where it is cheap, even taking into account the cost of extra trip fuel needed to carry the extra weight. A flight planning system can work out how much extra fuel will maximise profit. Note that discontinuities due to changes in flight levels can mean that a difference of as little as 100 kg (one passenger with luggage) in zero fuel weight or tankering fuel can make the difference between profit and loss.
- Inflight diversion
  While en route, an aircraft may be diverted to some airport other than the planned alternate. A flight planning system can produce a new flight plan for the new route from the diversion point and transmit it to the aircraft, including a check that there will be enough fuel for the revised flight.
- Inflight refuelling
  Military aircraft may refuel in midair. Such refuelling is a process rather than instantaneous. Some flight planning systems can allow for the change in fuel and show the effect on each aircraft involved.

== See also ==
- Civil Air Navigation Services Organisation (CANSO)
- Step climb
- Maximum zero-fuel weight
- Index of aviation articles
- Aviation meteorology
