= Servicio Meteorológico Nacional (Argentina) =

Argentina's national weather service

National Weather Service
- Servicio Meteorológico Nacional
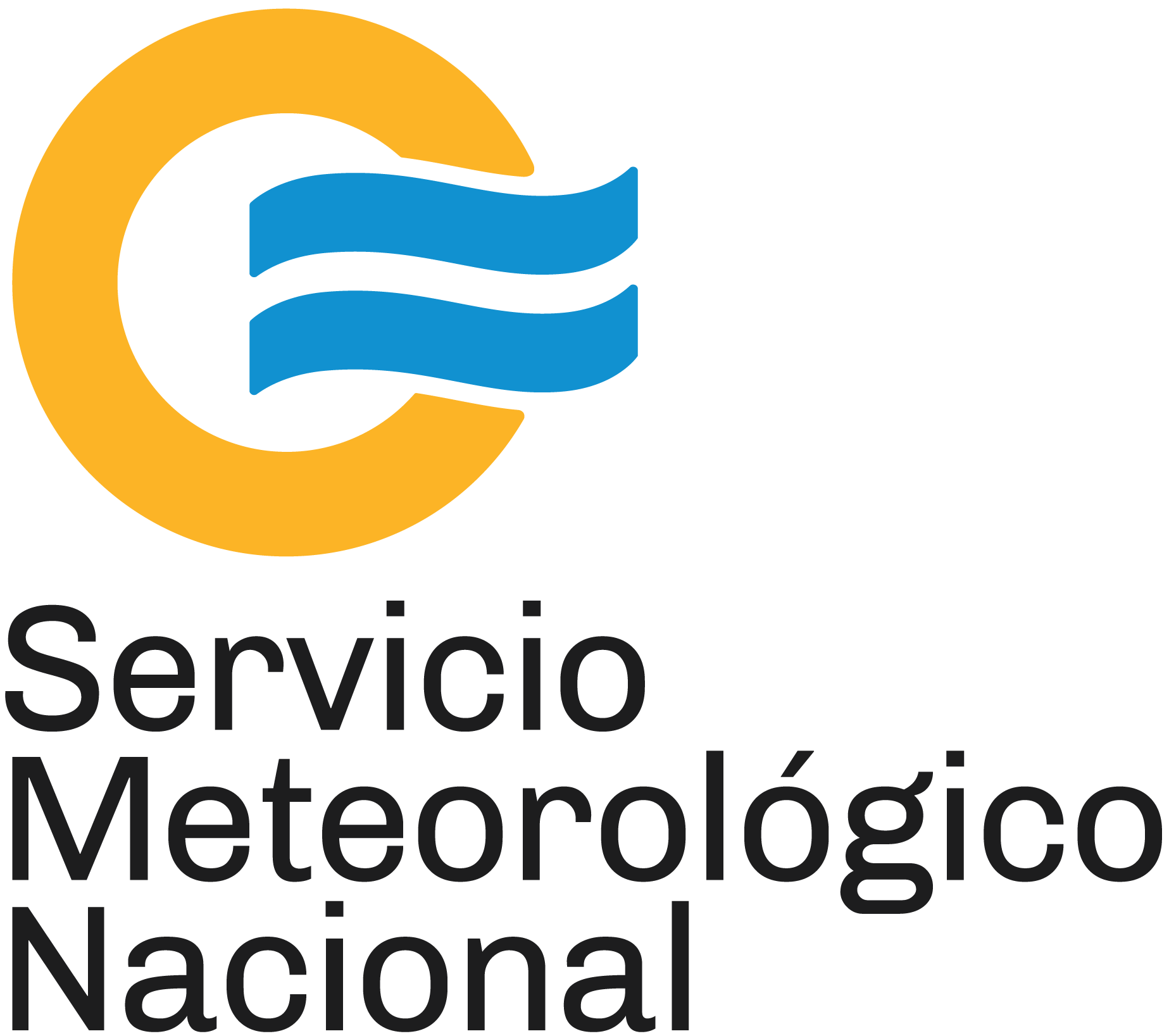

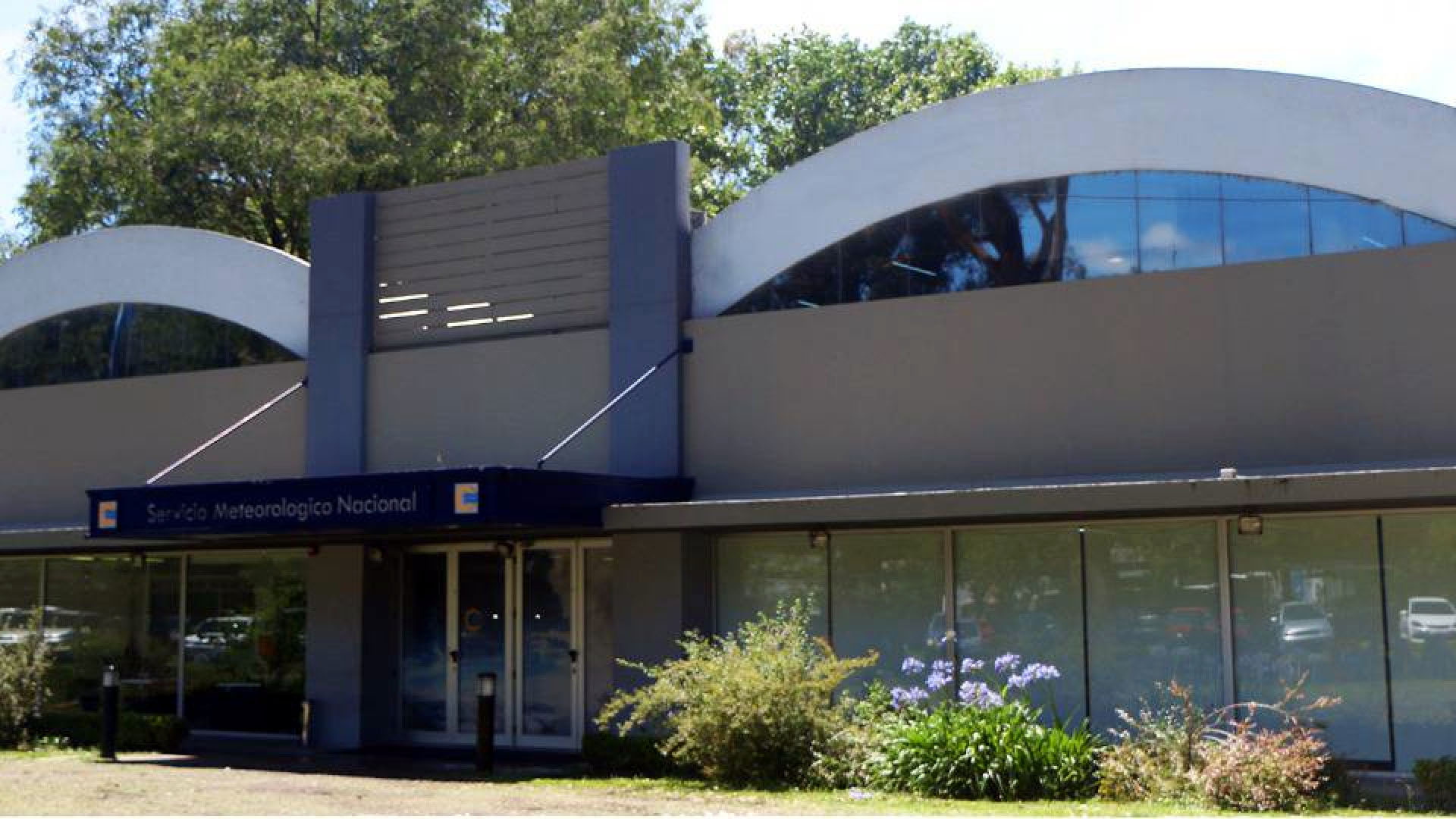
- SMN headquarters in Buenos Aires

Agency overview
- Formed: October 4, 1872; 153 years ago
- Jurisdiction: Argentina
- Headquarters: Av. Dorrego 4019, Buenos Aires
- Agency executive: Alejandro de la Torre, Director
- Parent agency: Ministry of Defense
- Website: smn.gob.ar

The National Weather Service (Spanish: Servicio Meteorológico Nacional) is an Argentine government agency under the Ministry of Defense that is tasked with observing, understanding, and predicting the weather and climate in Argentina and its surrounding waters. It provides weather forecasts, radar images, ozone, temperature and rainfall graphs, and satellite images. The purpose of these tasks is to contribute to protection of its inhabitants, sustainable economic development and to provide representation of Argentina to international meteorological organizations.

Founded on 4 October 1872 by Federal law Nº559 during the presidency of Domingo Faustino Sarmiento, the organisation was the first meteorological organisation in South America and the third one in the world, after Hungary and the United States which were created in 1870 and 1871 respectively. It became a member of the World Meteorological Organization on 2 January 1951. Throughout its history, the organisation was dependent under different government ministries until in 2007 when it is currently under the Ministry of Defense.

== History ==
The organisation was founded on 4 October 1872 by Federal law Nº559 during the presidency of Domingo Faustino Sarmiento under the name (Spanish: Oficina Meteorológica Argentina) or OMA for short with Dr. Benjamin Apthorp Gould as its first director. This made it the first meteorological organisation in South America and the third one in the world, after Hungary and the United States which were created in 1870 and 1871 respectively. The OMA was under the Ministry of Justice, Cult and Public Instruction (Spanish: Ministerio de Justicia, Culto e Instrucción Pública). The first national network of meteorological stations and geomagnetic observations was established in 1873. Later on that year from 2 September to 16 September, the OMA attended the International Meteorological Congress in Vienna, Austria-Hungary. The International Meteorological Congress in 1873 agreed for the establishment of the International Meteorological Organization. The first solar radiation observations were made in 1874 in Córdoba. In 1875, Argentina made the first international exchange of meteorological data with neighbouring Chile.

In 1898, Federal law Nº3727 was passed by the Argentine National Congress which transferred the OMA to Ministry of Agriculture (Spanish: Ministerio de Agricultura de la Nación). In June 1924, the OMA was renamed to (Spanish: Dirección Meteorológica) until September 1927 when it was changed to (Spanish: Dirección de Meteorología). Law Nº12252 was passed on 28 September 1935 kept the organisation still under the agriculture ministry but it was renamed to (Spanish: Dirección de Meteorología, Geofísica e Hidrología). The current name of the organization, Servicio Meteorológico Nacional (SMN) was created on 5 May 1945 when Decree Nº10131 was passed, placing SMN under the Secretary of Aeronautics (Spanish: Secretaría de Aeronáutica). This was later reinforced by law when the Argentine Congress passed Law Nº12945 on 29 January 1947 that officially established the name and creation of it.

On 9 March 1950, SMN was transferred to the Ministerio de Asuntos Técnicos de la Nación according to Decree Nº5197 until on 22 June 1954 when Decree Nº12248 reverted SMN to being back under the Ministry of Agriculture, under the new name (Spanish: Ministerio de Agricultura y Ganadería de la Nación). SMN became a member of the World Meteorological Organization on 2 January 1951. From 7 May 1957 until October 1966, SMN was under the Ministry of Aeronuatics (Spanish: Ministerio de Aeronáutica de la Nación). Later on, during the coup by Juan Carlos Onganía, SMN was directly under the Argentine Air Force for 40 years until 1 January 2007 when Decree Nº1689 finally transferred it back into civilian hands. Finally, Decree Nº1432 in 2007 made the organisation a decentralised one that was under the Ministry of Defense, giving it the ability to have its own control over its finances, its own legal status, and ability to act in both the private and public fields.

== List of directors ==
| Name | Period |
|---|---|
| Benjamin A. Gould | 1872–1884 |
| Gualterio Davis | 1885–1915 |
| Jorge Otis Wiggin | 1915–1924 |
| Federico Burmeister | 1924–1926 |
| Enrique G. Plate | 1926–1929 |
| Roberto C. Mossman | 1929–1930 |
| Martín Gil | 1930–1932 |
| Alfredo G. Galmarini | 1932–1949 |
| Hugo Civati Bernasconi | 1949–1950 |
| Carlos Nuñez Monasterio | 1950–1956 |
| Rolando V. García | 1956–1958 |
| Francisco Lucio Fernández | 1958–1966 |
| Torcuato de Alvear | 1966–1967 |
| Benigno Hector Andrada | 1967–1970 |
| Caros A. Natalio Grasselli | 1971–1972 |
| Reynaldo A. Bertinotti | 1972–1973 |
| José E. Echeveste | 1974–1982 |
| Salvador Alaimo | 1983–1993 |
| Ramón A. Sonzini | 1993–2000 |
| Ricardo A. Grünert | 2001–2004 |
| Miguel Ángel Rabiolo | 2004–2007 |
| Héctor H. Ciappesoni | 2007–2014 |
| Celeste Saulo | 2014–present |

== Weather stations ==
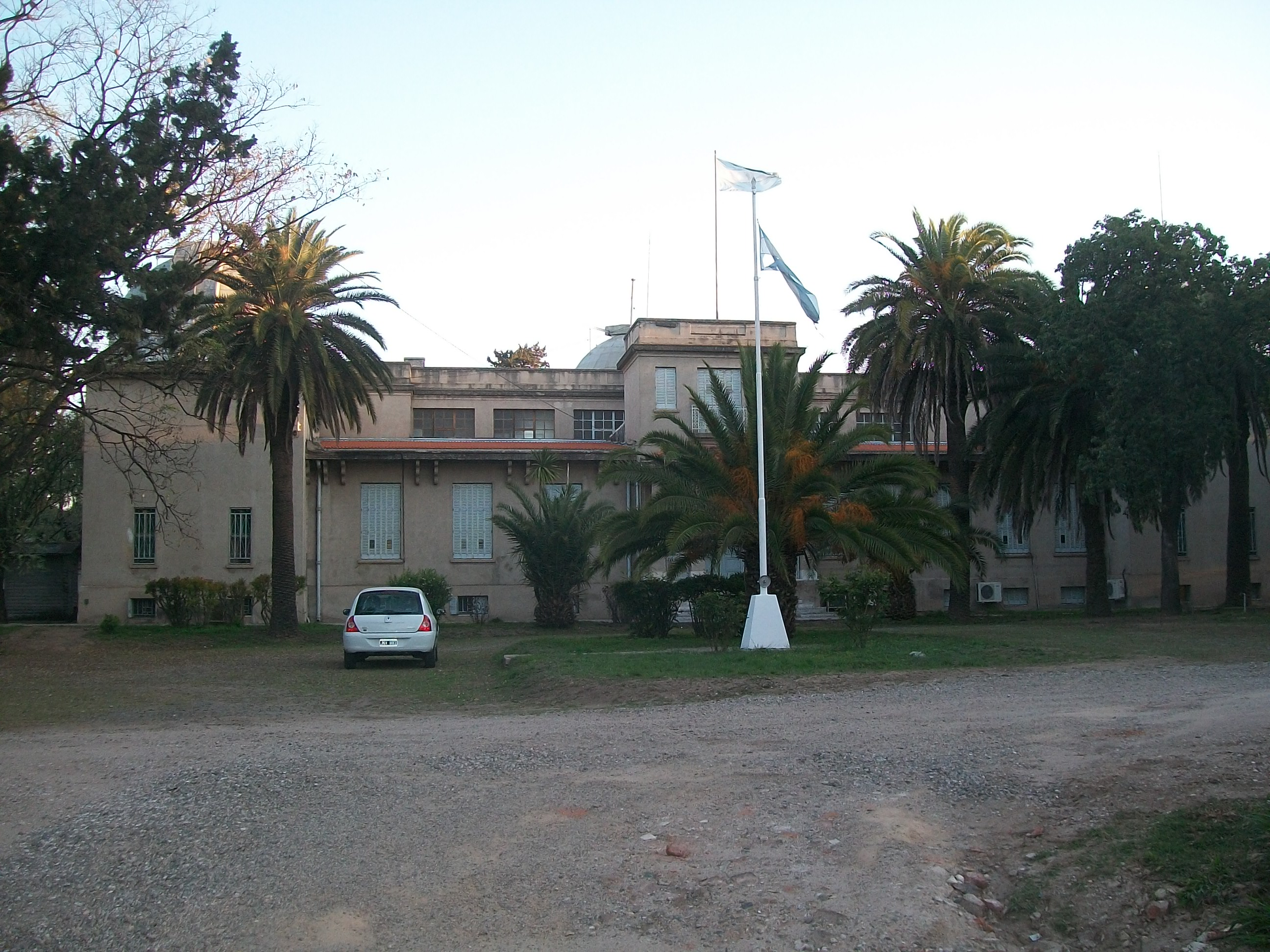
SMN station in Córdoba Province

Currently, SMN has 125 weather stations that extended across both Argentina and Antarctica. They also include a network of observatories that measure atmospheric parameters in addition to the meteorological parameters such as ultraviolet radiation, solar radiation, and ozone levels.

The first weather station in Antarctica was in 1904 when an observatory that both measured meteorological and geomagnetic parameters was open on Orcadas Base on Laurie Island in the South Orkney Islands (Spanish: Orcadas del Sur). Currently, SMN maintains 6 synoptic weather stations in Antarctica on the Antarctic bases operated by Argentina (Carlini Base, San Martín Base, Belgrano II Base, Esperanza Base, Marambio Base, and Orcadas Base).

== Prevenir project and how AI is part of it ==
The Prevenir project in Argentina, a collaborative effort between Argentine and Japanese entities, utilizes AI and other methodologies to develop an early warning system for urban floods. Focused initially on vulnerable areas in Buenos Aires and Córdoba, it pioneers advanced forecasting techniques in the region.

Led by researchers like Juan Jose Ruiz, Prevenir's approach resembles Google's tool on a smaller scale, with a focus on precipitation dynamics. Despite less extensive data availability compared to international counterparts, Argentine models leverage radar-provided information for future precipitation system predictions.

Apart from enhancing flood forecasts and alerts, Prevenir aims to expand observation networks and raise public awareness about risk prevention. Leveraging high-performance supercomputers like Clementina XXI and Fugaku, the project marks a significant step towards more effective disaster management in Argentina and potentially worldwide.

== Volcanic Ash Advisory Centre ==
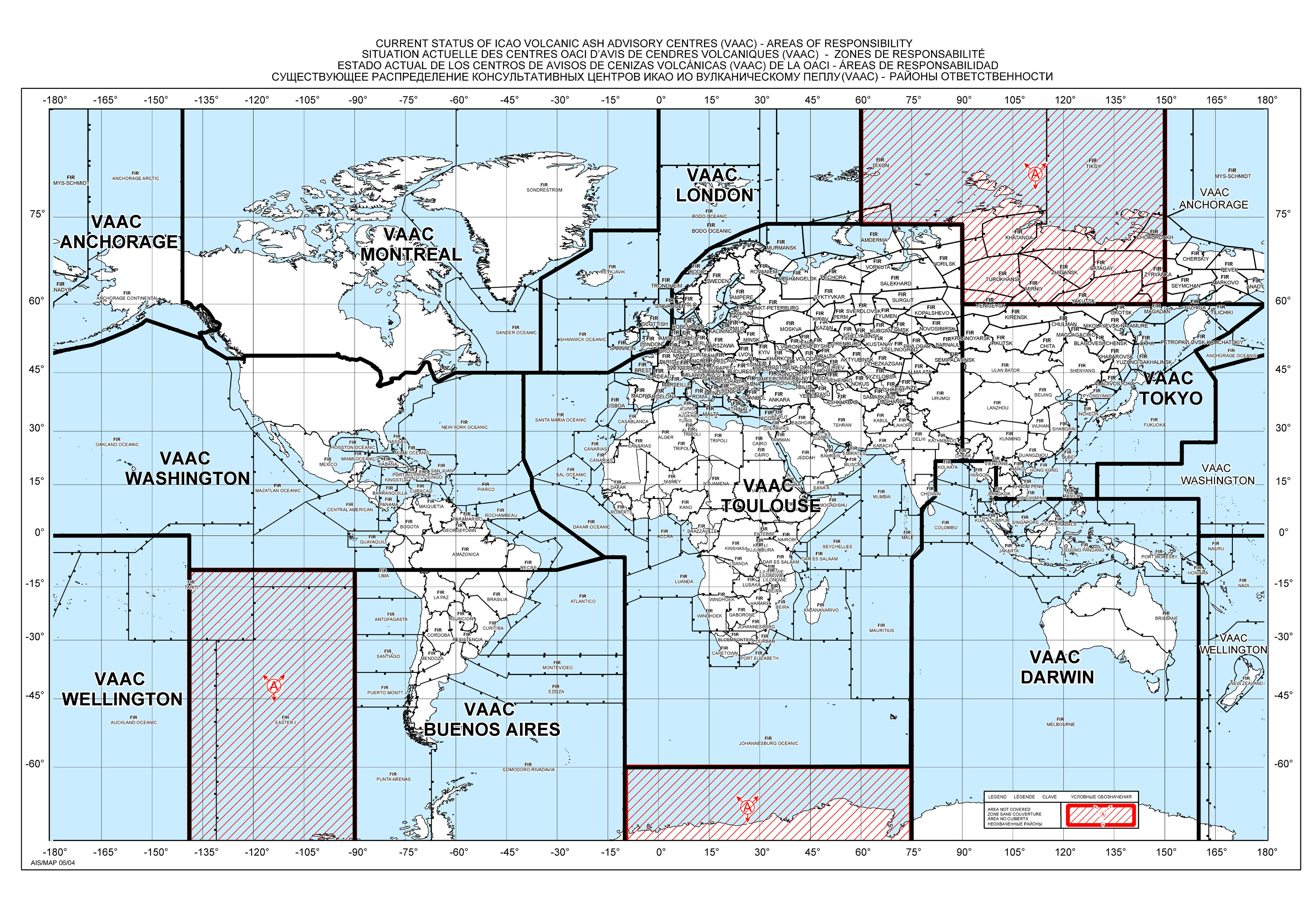
Coverage of the nine VAAC

There are 9 Volcanic Ash Advisory Centres (VAAC for short) around the world that are responsible for monitoring volcanic ash to provide critical information and maintain aviation safety. SMN is responsible for the Buenos Aires VAAC, which covers all areas from longitudes 90oW to 10^{o}W and latitudes 10^{o}S to 90^{o}S. VAACs are designated regional meteorological centres that are tasked with observing the movement of volcanic ash into the atmosphere during volcanic eruptions. The functions and responsibilities of the Buenos Aires VAAC are listed below:

- Examine data from geostationary and polar orbit satellites to detect the existence and extent of any volcanic ash in the atmosphere.
- Create computer simulations to model the trajectory of volcanic ash to predict the movement of ash clouds when the volcanic ash has been detected.
- Issue advisory information with respect to the extent and forecasted movement of volcanic ash clouds to Meteorological Watch Offices (MWO), Area control centres, and Flight information service centres that are service Flight information regions affected by the volcanic ash.
- Issue advisory information with respect to the extent and forecasted movement of volcanic ash clouds to other VAACs under their areas that they cover.
- Issue advisory information with respect to the extent and forecasted movement of volcanic ash clouds to World Area Forecast Centres (WAFC), the relevant regional forecast centres, and international data banks OPMET.
- Issue advisory information to meteorological offices, area control centres, flight information regions, and other VAACs when necessary every 6 hours at a minimum until no more volcanic ash clouds can be detected based on satellite data or when no more new notices about volcanic eruptions or when the VAAC does not receive any more new information regarding volcanic ash clouds in the area.

== See also ==
- Climate of Argentina
