= Climber =

Climber, or Climbers may refer to:

- Climber, a participant in the activity of climbing
- Climber, general name for a vine or other climbing plant
- Climber, or climbing specialist, a road bicycle racer who can ride especially well on highly inclined roads
- Climber (BEAM), a robot that goes upward or downward on a track
- Climber (video game), by Nintendo
- Climber Motor Company, a motor vehicle manufacturer in Arkansas
- Climbers (novel), a 1989 novel by M. John Harrison
- The Climber (1917 film), a silent drama film
- The Climber (1966 film), a Yugoslav drama film
- The Climber (1975 film), an Italian crime film
- The Climber (album), an album by Judge Smith
- The Climber (manga), a Japanese climbing manga
- Dynamic Sport Climber, a Polish paramotor design

== See also ==
- Climbing (disambiguation)
- The Climbers (disambiguation)
- Crazy Climber, a 1980 coin-operated arcade game
- Ice Climber, a 1984 video game by Nintendo
- List of climbers
