= The Climbers =

The Climbers may refer to:

- The Climbers (band), a British band
- The Climbers (play), 1901 play by Clyde Fitch
- The Climbers (1915 film), a lost 1915 silent film based on the play
- The Climbers (1919 film), a 1919 silent film based on the play
- The Climbers (1927 film), a lost 1927 silent film based on the play
- The Climbers (2019 film), a film directed by Daniel Lee with a guest appearance by Jackie Chan

== See also ==
- Climber (disambiguation)
