= National Comprehensive High School =

- Limbe, Cameroon

The National Comprehensive High School is a secondary school in Limbe, Cameroon.

Known by its acronym NCHS Limbe, the school was created in 1972 by some parents who were interested in commercial education, at the time when most of the schools around that part of Cameroon were public schools offering mainly general education. It was set up not for profit making, but as an institution that will promote education and create job opportunities in the life of young Cameroonians. It was basically for commercial education but as a result of the growth in population and as need arises over time, the general education section was created some few years later. As of now the secondary and high school both commercial and (general education 1st cycle only) have a population of more than 500 students, producing excellent results in both the General Certificate of Education (GCE) Ordinary and Advance Levels.

== See also ==
- Education in Cameroon
- Government Bilingual High School Limbe
