= Step climb =

Series of altitude gains

A step climb in aviation is a series of altitude gains that improve fuel economy by moving into thinner air as an aircraft becomes lighter and becomes capable of flying in the thinner air at a higher altitude.

== Description ==
Since the early days of jet aircraft and commercial travel, the technique of gradually climbing in cruise altitude as fuel burns off and the aircraft becomes lighter has been widely used by pilots. The altitude that provides the most fuel-efficient cruise (at the desired speed) at the start of a long flight, when the aircraft is fully loaded with fuel, is not the same as the altitude that provides the best efficiency at the end of the flight when most of the fuel aboard has been burned. This latter altitude is usually significantly higher than the former. By climbing gradually throughout the cruise phase of a flight, pilots can make the most economical use of their fuel.

Originally, a simple cruise climb was used by pilots. This amounted to a simple, continuous, very gradual climb from an initial cruise altitude to a final cruise altitude, and made the most efficient use of fuel. However, with increasing air traffic and the assignment of distinct flight levels to specific flights, airways, and directions of flight, it is no longer safe to climb continuously in this way, and so most flights compromise by climbing in distinct steps—a step climb—with air traffic control (ATC) approval, in order to ensure that the aircraft is always at an appropriate altitude for traffic control. While not quite as efficient as a continuous cruise climb, step climbs are still more efficient than maintaining a single altitude throughout a flight. The step climb intervals may be 1,000 or 2,000 or 4,000 ft (300 or 610 or 1,220 m), depending on the flight level rules which apply on the particular airway being flown.

Where traffic is not an issue, cruise climbs may still be used. Concorde, for example, used a continuous cruise climb throughout its flights, since there was normally never any other traffic at the same altitude (nearly 18,000 m (60,000 ft)) in the same direction.

In most modern commercial airliners, computers such as flight management systems (FMS) calculate and/or execute the proper steps in a step climb, in order to maximize the efficiency realized by the technique.

Step and cruise climbs are not normally applicable to lower-flying aircraft propelled by conventional piston engines with propellers or turboprops, since their performance characteristics may be very different from those of turbofan or jet engined aircraft. In fact, the most efficient altitude for a small general aviation aircraft may be only some 300–1000 meters (a few thousand feet) above the ground, and increasing altitude may diminish efficiency rather than improve it (propellers tend to lose efficiency in thinner air, and many small general aviation aircraft lack supercharging, effectively decreasing the engine's compression pressure, and therefore efficiency, as the aircraft climbs into more rarefied atmosphere).

=== Informal step climbs ===
Some pilots use "rules of thumb" for determining when to perform a step climb. These "rules" do not consider the effects of different winds at different levels; computerised flight planning systems may be better at height optimisation, and may even include 'step descents' in certain weather conditions. Two of the information rules used by some pilots are:

- Keep climbing whenever the aircraft is light enough to climb to the next highest available flight level, until it is time for descent.
- If it is possible to stay at the next higher cruise flight level for 20 minutes or more before "top of descent" (TOD) then it is cost-effective to make the climb.

== See also ==
- Air traffic control
- Flight level
- Flight management system
- Flight planning
- North Atlantic Tracks
- RVSM
- Fuel starvation
