= Limb =

Limb or Limbs may refer to:

== Science and technology ==
- Limb (anatomy), an appendage of a human or animal
- Limb, a large or main branch of a tree
- Limb, in astronomy, the curved edge of the apparent disk of a celestial body, e.g. lunar limb
- Limb, in botany, the border or upper spreading part of a petal or sepal
- Limb, in a measuring instrument, the graduated edge of a circle or arc

== Music ==
- Limb (album), by Foetus, 2009
- Limb, an album by Justin Clayton, 1999
- "Limbs", a song by Emma Pollock from Watch the Fireworks, 2007
- "Limbs", a song by James Marriott from Don't Tell the Dog, 2025

== Other uses ==
- Limb (surname), a list of people
- Limb McKenry (1888–1956), American baseball pitcher
- Limb Brook, a stream in Sheffield, South Yorkshire, England
- Limbs Dance Company, in Auckland, New Zealand
- Limbs, in archery, the upper and lower working parts of the bow; see recurve bow
- Bresso Airfield, Bresso, Italy (ICAO code)
- Limbu script (ISO 15924 code)

== See also ==
- Limb darkening, an optical effect seen in stars
- Limbe (disambiguation)
