= NetSys =

South African–based company providing services to airlines

NetSys International (PTY) LTD
- Type: Proprietary limited company
- Industry: Aviation, Meteorology, Weather
- Founded: 1981
- Headquarters: Pretoria, South Africa
- Website: www.netsys.aero

NetSys International (Pty) Ltd. is a South African–based company which delivers telecommunication and meteorological data-processing solutions for the weather and aviation industries.

== History ==
NetSys was registered in 1981 as a private company (Company registration no: 1981/02825/07). It was founded for the purpose of developing network communications equipment and automatic message-switching systems. The first customer was the South African Defence Force, which ordered a logistics network comprising around 50 nodes of Proprietary Networking Devices. The experience gained during this deployment was instrumental in entering into the international market.

In 1988, NetSys was awarded a contract with Control Data Corporation to develop a meteorological message-switching system on the back of the NetSys network devices. This contract, as well as subsequent investment in aviation-related products, enabled NetSys to become a major solutions supplier in the Meteorological and Aviation industries.

Since the work done for Control Data Corporation, NetSys has won several tenders from a number of prestigious organizations. The main product was the Weather Forecaster, a message switch tailored for the effective management of weather reports.

In 1996, NetSys entered into the new area of Aviation with the commissioning of an automated Met and AIS pilot briefing system in Sweden, under the system name of Met/AIS. Isak Lombard, an executive director of NetSys, also joined NetSys in 1996 to become part of the Met/AIS team. The Met/AIS system became Flight-Man, which was subsequently acquired by aviation authorities in many other countries.

NetSys International, in a strategic move to ensure that it remained a leader in its chosen fields, sought ISO Accreditation during 1998, achieving this goal on 29 March 1999 when NetSys received its ISO 9001 Accreditation Certificate from DEKRA – ITS Certification Services (Pty) Ltd.

In another strategic move, NetSys decided in 2001 to supply commercial off-the-shelf (COTS) hardware for its system solutions – Cisco Systems for synchronous connections and Wide Area Network interfaces, 3Com for Local Area Network connections, Digi for asynchronous ports, Hewlett-Packard and Dell for server hardware are given preference when proposing new deals.

In 2003, NetSys decided to consolidate its applications under one umbrella user interface to provide a consistent look-and-feel for a diverse set of applications and different types of users. The solution was based on a client-server architecture where much of the existing proven server software (NSSRV) is re-used but exposed in modern client software (NSWS).

This new solution is called the NetSys Solutions approach, where necessary elements from the server and client software are chosen and utilized to create a best-fit solution for the customer's needs.

NetSys entered a new development direction in 2004 with the creation of its NOTAM management software. This system is currently in operation in Taiwan.

== Origin of the name ==
NetSys was founded as Network Systems. The name was changed in 1988 to a shorter form, Netsys International, and finally in 2004 by the managing director of the time, to NetSys International. In 1993, Netsys UK was registered to act as the NetSys UK representative.

=== Meteorological communication centres/Regional telecommunication hubs ===
NetSys has a number of users that fall into this category. These users are typically responsible for the ingestion and dissemination of weather data. They provide a service for their clients by selectively distributing data based on routing tables

The routing tables are based on the WMO headers, or it may be AFTN sending groups and addresses. Such a communication center, normally, has a number of data sources and destinations which may support a variety of protocols. The product that is traditionally used is weather forecasters. More recent users use the NSSRV MHS with the modern NSWS Control Center.

The NetSys software fulfills the needs of a Regional Telecommunications Hub (RTH), as specified by the World Meteorological Organization (WMO). In this category, NetSys has its message-switching software in South Africa (Pretoria), India (Delhi), Hungary (Budapest), Switzerland (Zurich) and Poland (Warsaw).

Another sub-category of these users are those responsible for message communication but more under the auspices of the International Civil Aviation Authority (ICAO). These users are typically connected to the AFTN for the reception and transmission of MET data. The CoreMet system of UK NATS at the Heathrow communication center is an example of such a site. This system is also responsible for the data quality and the uplink of all OPMET data disseminated over the SADIS satellite broadcast. In this regard, WeatherMan is used extensively to automatically correct systematic errors and rejected messages are sent to the NSWS Control Centre for manual correction with the aid of system-provided diagnostics and hints.

Another category of software that is used by NATS for example is the NSWS Met Data Monitor. It is used to monitor the timely arrival of data from different locations. Late arrivals are displayed on a dynamic map and with this functionality NATS can very quickly identify regional communication breakdowns around the globe. It also broadcasts reports of late arrivals as administrative messages to SADIS users, thus applying some peer pressure for performance improvement.

=== Data banks ===
It might be required by international organizations that some countries provide international and local data banks of OPMET or NOTAM. Examples of these are the European OPMET databanks in Brussels and Vienna, and EAD at Eurocontrol. The NetSys systems at BelgoControl are responsible for providing the Brussels databank.

=== Flight information services/Flight planning centres ===
Certain civil aviation authorities place a high value on quality and personalised pre-flight briefings. They require a system that automatically delivers pre-flight bulletins where needed: via email, fax, or paper delivery. Each bulletin is tailor-made based on the flight route, derived from the flight plan. A typical requirement is to provide the most essential information possible, avoiding overloading the cockpit with unnecessary paper and irrelevant data. For this purpose, these users typically require a narrow route briefing, where only information that touches or overlaps the flight corridor is included. An example of an excellent flight briefing service is the FPC at Arlanda in Sweden. A perfect product for such a customer is NSWS Flight Briefing with the necessary NSSRV components added as required, such as fax drivers. Legal records of all delivered flight briefings are also kept to provide an exact history. This may be crucial during an accident investigation.

=== Large airports ===
Many airports require a larger and integrated system. Normally this involves connecting a number of fringe systems and centralizing data collection and distribution, the display of CCTV screens at control towers, processing of runway instrumentation output (e.g. RVR and wind) and much more. Here NetSys has the ability to use its NSSRV MHS to centralize the collection of data and distribute it in a controlled manner to all client systems. It allows a centralized archiving function that becomes crucial during accident investigations. NetSys can also integrate many data formats and massage them to fit the client's needs. An example is the special message format requirements for ATIS or VOLMET systems as implemented in Belgium and India for example. NetSys developed one of the first interfaces to an AMHS to exchange meteorological data using the X.400 protocol.

=== Remote airports ===
There are many airports that do not have their own forecasters or a proper infrastructure to link them with forecasting centers but that need to supply pilots with weather briefings. This is a potential larger market but with relatively low margin and project costs. NSWS WAFS together with a satellite receiver for SADIS or ISCS is used in this scenario. NetSys has many such small sites, many of which have been sponsored by IATA or managed by ICAO. Examples of current sites include Saudi Arabia, Oman, Ecuador, Mongolia, Afghanistan and China. NSWS WAFS displays the WAFS data and allows the user to produce Meteorological briefings.

=== Aviation forecasting ===
Some civil aviation authorities have a meteorological department that provides local weather forecasting. An example is BelgoControl in Belgium, where the organization has a number of forecasters that produce local forecasts specifically for aviation customers such as airlines, freight operators and private pilots. NetSys also maintains a climate database for BelgoControl in which SYNOP, METAR and TAF messages for selected stations are decoded up to element level and stored for research and quality control purposes. TAMC in Taiwan is another example of a user that produces its own SIGWX charts with NSWS Forecaster.

=== Flight information centres/NOTAM Offices ===
There are many NOTAM offices in the world that still use a paper system to manage the NOTAM. The lack of computerization is because of the wide deviation from NOTAM standards, as well as the high importance of this data. Unlike those of Met data, NOTAM data volumes are low, with each piece being of high significance instead. Carefully assigned sequence numbers guard the validity of the database. This market contains large amounts of potential, but faces its own challenges. Integration with an AIP is essential, should one want to fully utilize FPL routes.

== Major customer installations ==
Including the major sites listed below, NetSys provides customer support in over 17 countries around the world.

- SMI in Zurich, Switzerland
- LFV in Stockholm, Sweden
- NATS at Heathrow in London, United Kingdom
- IMD in Delhi, Kolkata, Mumbai and Chennai, India
- Belgocontrol in Brussels, Belgium
- IM at Lisbon and Islands, Portugal
- ANWS in Taipei, Taiwan
- SAWS in Pretoria, South Africa
- ATMB in Beijing, Shanghai and Guangzhou, China
