= World Area Forecast Center =

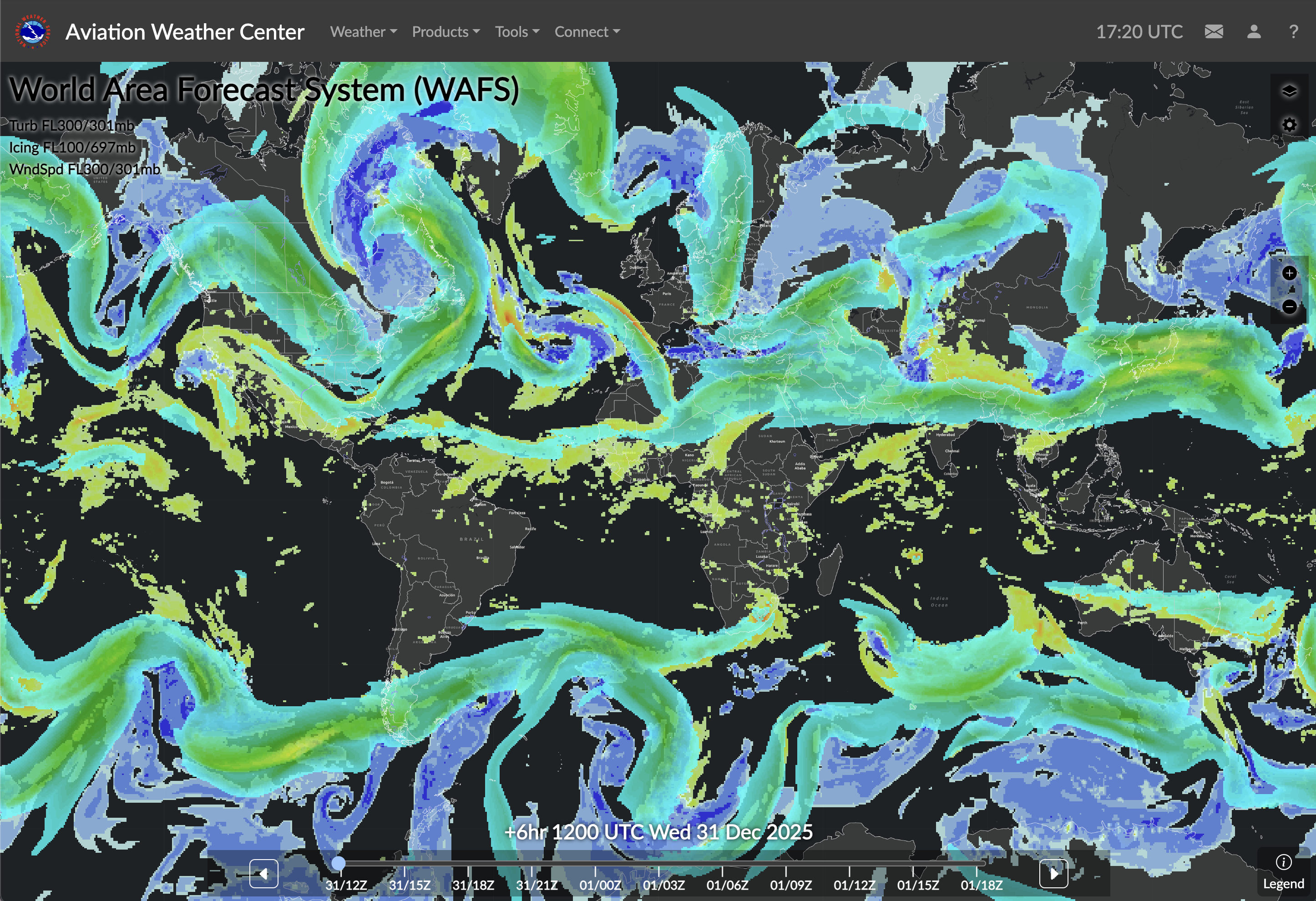
Screenshot of World Area Forecast System produced by Aviation Weather Center, National Weather Service, United States

A World Area Forecast Centre (WAFC) is a meteorological centre that provides real-time meteorological information broadcasts for aviation purposes. These broadcasts are supervised by International Civil Aviation Organization (ICAO), the U.S. Federal Aviation Administration (FAA), NOAA/National Weather Service (NWS), with additional contributions from the World Meteorological Organization (WMO), the United Kingdom, Finland, Canada, and others, in order to fulfill requirements of the ICAO Annex 3 covering meteorological information which is necessary for flights. The role of the WAFCs is to provide meteorological messages with worldwide coverage for pilot briefing. They are usually part of the Pre-Flight Information Bulletin (PIB).

WAFC provide various types of data, including OPMET(Operational Meteorological) information, T4 charts (which are currently obsolete but some portions are still distributed due to legacy reasons), and GRIB and BUFR charts - these are Wind and Temperature charts and SIGWX charts (Significant Weather Chart) for SWH (high levels) and SWM (medium levels).

There are only two World Area Forecast Centres, each providing a backup for the other. These are the UK Met Office and Washington NOAA, working in duplicate so it would be possible to replace each other in a case of failure. Each of these two services operates its own satellite-based broadcast system to distribute data to airports all over the world. The Met Office system is called SADIS (SAtellite DIstribution System) and mainly covers Europe, Asia, Indian Ocean and Africa. The NOAA broadcast system is the International Satellite Communications System (ISCS) and mainly covers America and the Pacific Ocean.
