= Anacláudia Rossbach =

Brazilian economist

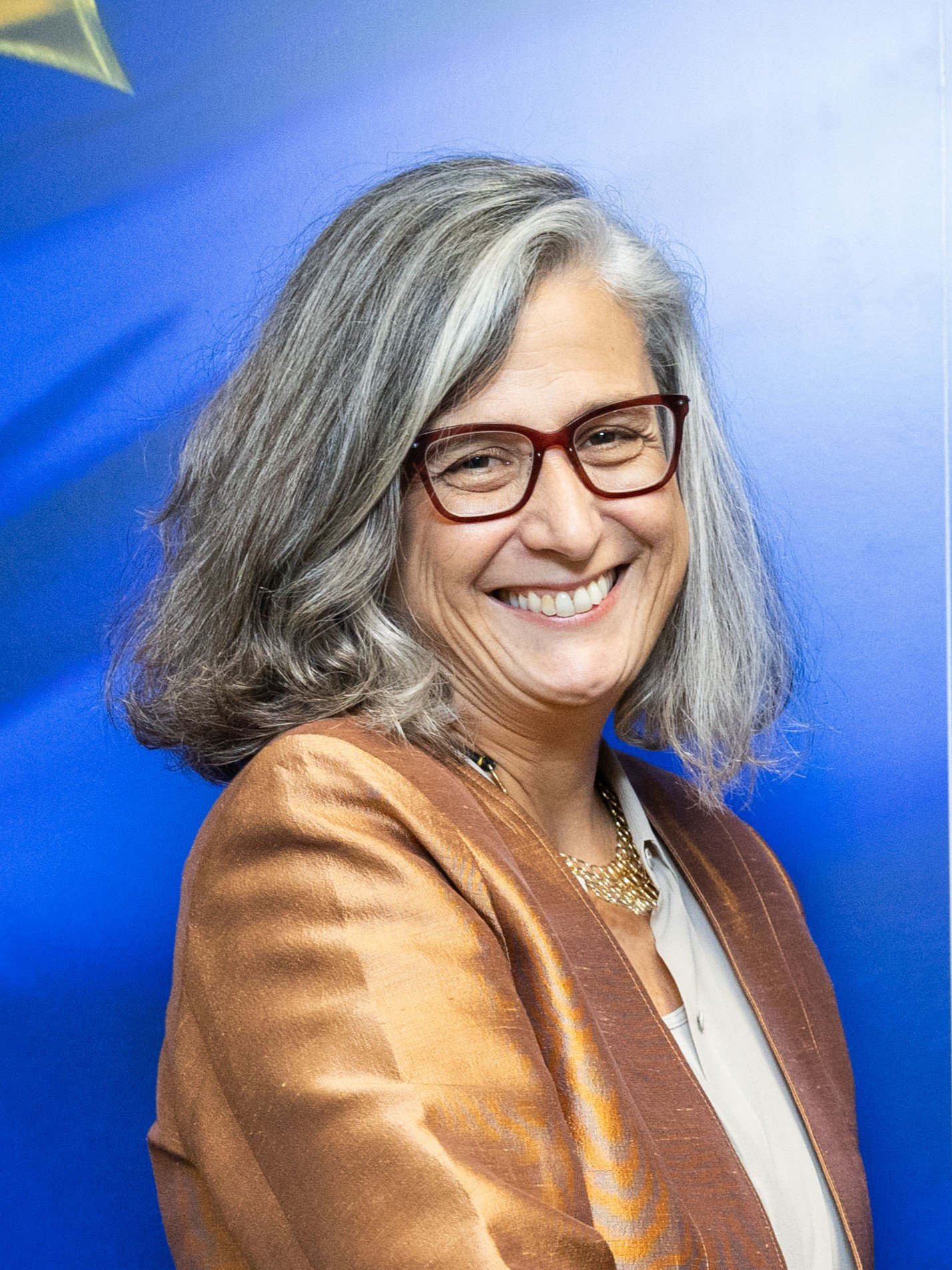
- Rossbach at the European Commission in 2026
- Born: c.1970 São Paulo
- Known for: Executive Director of the United Nations Human Settlements Programme (UN-Habitat)
- Predecessor: Maimunah Mohd Sharif

Anacláudia Marinheiro Centeno Rossbach is a Brazilian economist who is the executive director of the United Nations Human Settlements Programme (UN-Habitat).

== Life ==
Rossbach was born in about 1970 in São Paulo in Brazil, but she had a varied upbringing as her father's job took the family to different homes. She went to university to study economics working as an intern in local government. After she graduated she was employed by the British consultancy KPMG to audit accounts. She worked both in Brazil and in Portugal.

In 1996 she left KPMG and returned to Brazil with her husband and their two children. She returned to education and took a master's degree.

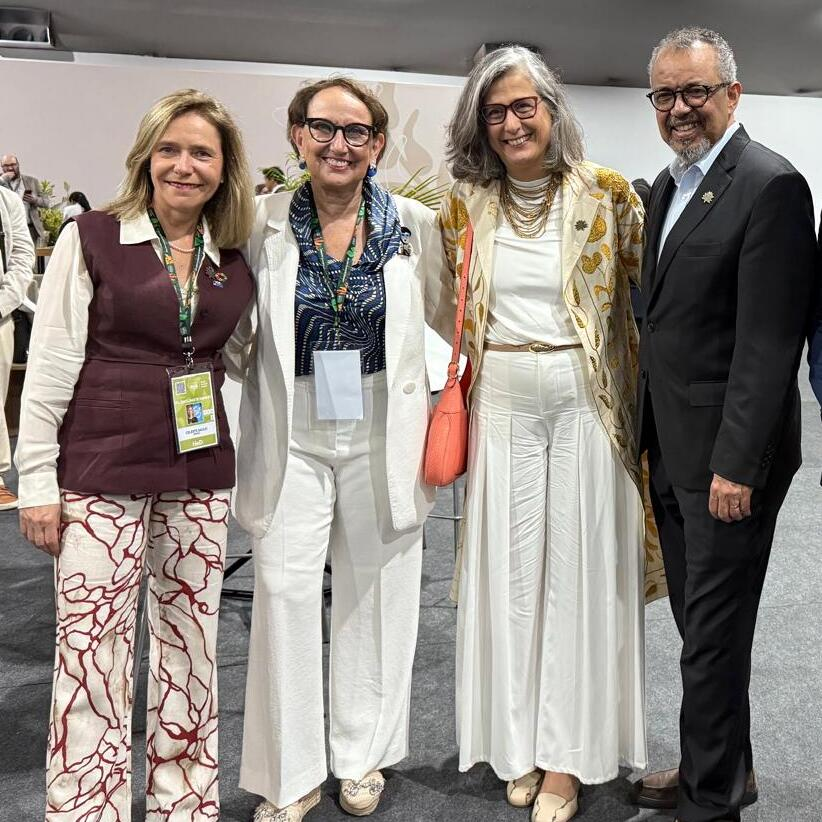
Meteorologist Celeste Saulo, UNCTAD's Rebeca Grynspan, Anaclaudia Rossbach and WHO's Tedros Adhanom Ghebreyesus at COP30

She worked for the World Bank helping to improve housing in Brazil before she became the Director for Latin America and the Caribbean at the US think tank Lincoln Institute of Land Policy from 2022 to 2024. She was also a regional manager for Cities Alliance.

In 2024 she succeeded the Malaysian Maimunah Mohd Sharif as executive director of the United Nations Human Settlements Programme after being nominated by the Secretary General António Guterres. UN-Habitat's strategic plan is backed by over 100 member of the United Nations. She leads UN-Habitat who are concerned with improving the lives of about 300 million who have no homes, one billion who live in "informal housing" and three billion whose homes are considered inadequate.
