= Government Bilingual High School Limbe =

Coordinates: 4.0391°N 9.20751°E

- Limbe, Cameroon

The Government Bilingual High School (GBHS) is a secondary school in Limbe, Cameroon.

== See also ==
- Education in Cameroon
- National Comprehensive High School
- Government High School (GHS) Limbe
