= Satellite Distribution System =

Satellite-based broadcast system

The Satellite Distribution System (SADIS) is a worldwide satellite-based broadcast system dedicated to primarily distributing aeronautical meteorological information in line with International Civil Aviation Organization (ICAO) standards. Together with the International Satellite Communications System (ISCS), SADIS forms a global distribution system for meteorological information to all member states. SADIS forms part of the ICAO Aeronautical Fixed Service (AFS).

== History ==
In Montreal, 1982, the world area forecast system (WAFS) was established by the ICAO Communications/Meteorology to aid in the supply of meteorological information to authorities and users. It was decided that in the final phase of WAFS, the products should be distributed globally by satellite broadcast. Two WAFCs (World Area Forecast Centre) were created, one in Washington, and the other in Bracknell, UK. Because of limitations in forecasting techniques and telecommunication systems, the project had to be implemented in two phases. Initially, there would, apart from the two WAFCs, be regional area forecast centres (RAFCs). In the final phase the RAFCs would be closed.

Satellite distribution was a prerequisite for closing the RAFCs. It was decided that three Intelsat satellites would be used. Two will be provided by the United States for the distribution of WAFC Washington products over the Americas, Pacific and Eastern Asia. The other was provided by the UK, and became known as SADIS.

The first two-way SADIS terminal was installed at the South African Weather Bureau in Pretoria. A conference attended by a delegation of Met Specialists from all over the world were held at the Kruger National Park. A demonstration of the efficiency of satellite communications was held at the Kruger National Park. MMS installed a SADIS terminal in the Park to display the reception of data from Bracknell. The software for the installation in Pretoria was provided by NetSys International. NetSys also hosted the conference in the Kruger National Park.

== Satellites ==
The Indian Ocean Intelsat 604 at 60E was used to cover the ICAO AFI and MID regions and in the Asia and EUR regions as far eastwards as 140E. The uplink was at Whitehill, Oxfordshire, UK.

== SADIS2G ==
SADIS2G, introduced in September 2004, is the second generation SADIS system, and was intended to replace SADIS1G. As of 31 December 2008, all users are expected to use SADIS2G.
