= Limb (surname) =

Limb is the surname of:

- Allen Limb (1886–1975), Australian cricketer
- Ann Limb (born 1953), British educationalist and business leader
- Bobby Limb (1924–1999), Australian-born entertainer
- Charles Limb, American surgeon and neuroscientist
- John O. Limb, Australian engineer
- Sue Limb (born 1946), British writer and broadcaster
- Thomas Limb (1850–1901), English cricketer
