= Limbé, Cameroon =

Limbe Bimbia Victoria
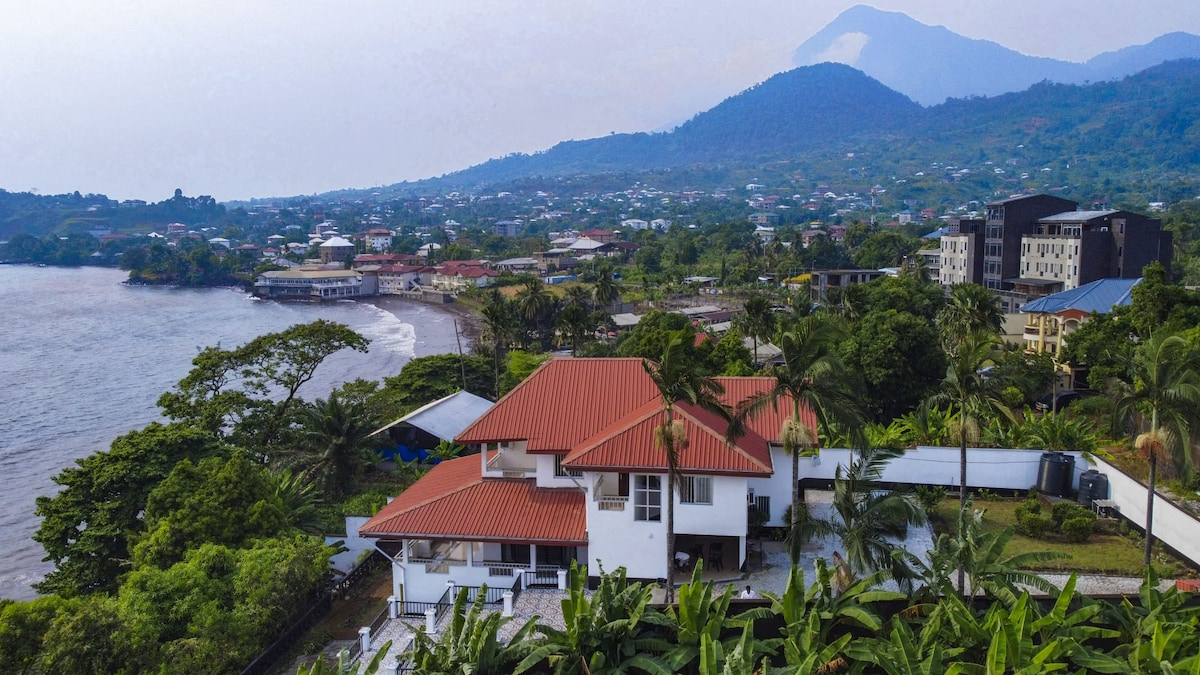
- A tourist area in Limbe
- Nickname: Town of Friendship
- Location in Cameroon
- Coordinates: 4°01′N 9°13′E
- Country: Cameroon
- Region: South-West
- Divisions: Fako
- Founded: 1858
- Elevation: 150 m (490 ft)

Population (2005)
  - Total: 84,223 (Census)
- Climate: Am

Limbe (known as Victoria from 1858 to 1982) is a seaside city in the South-West Region of Cameroon. At the 2005 Census, the population was 84,223.

== Toponymy ==
The city name Limbe is generally held to originate from a mispronunciation of the name of a German engineer called Limburgh. Oral narratives hold that this engineer is responsible for constructing a bridge across one of the rivers in the city. Over some time, this river came to be associated with this engineer. In 1982, a presidential decree signed by president Ahmadou Babatoura Ahidjo changed the city name from Victoria to Limbe.

== History ==
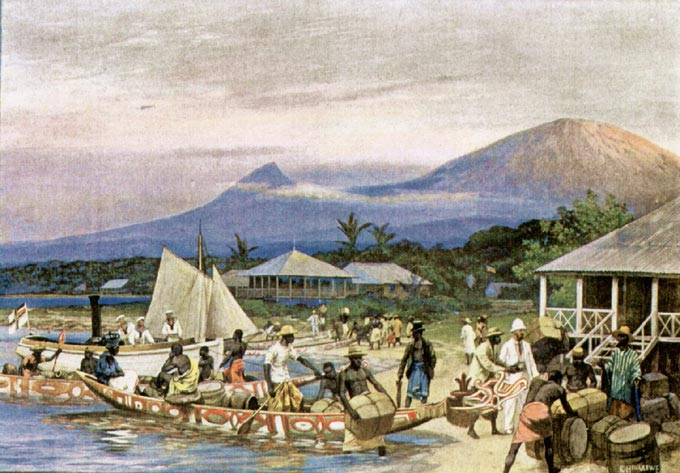
1908 painting by R. Hellgrewe of the town when it was known as Victoria

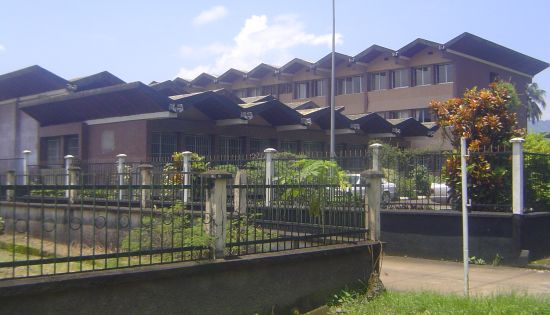
Limbe city council building

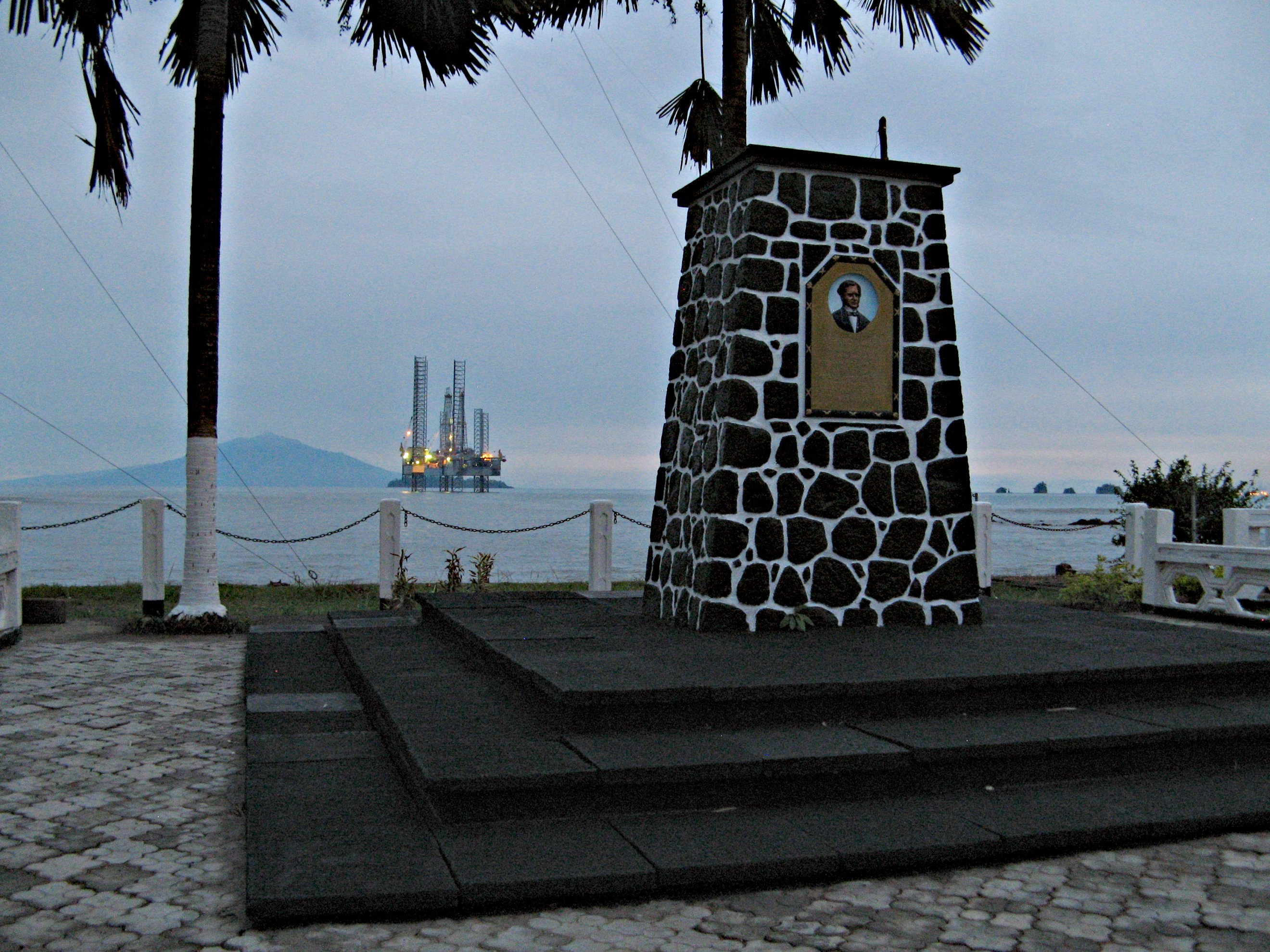
Monument to Alfred Saker

Initially, Victoria and its vicinity were not part of the new German colony Kamerun and remained under British administration. On May 7, 1886, Great Britain and Germany agreed to exchange Victoria and its vicinity for German rights at the Forcados River in Nigeria and at St Lucia in Natal. On March 28, 1887, Victoria and its vicinity were handed over to the German administration. At the same time, Swiss Presbyterian missionaries bought the land from the Baptist Missionary Society in 1887.

Victoria became British again in 1915, becoming part of British Cameroon. In 1982 Victoria was renamed "Limbe" by Ahmadou Ahidjo.

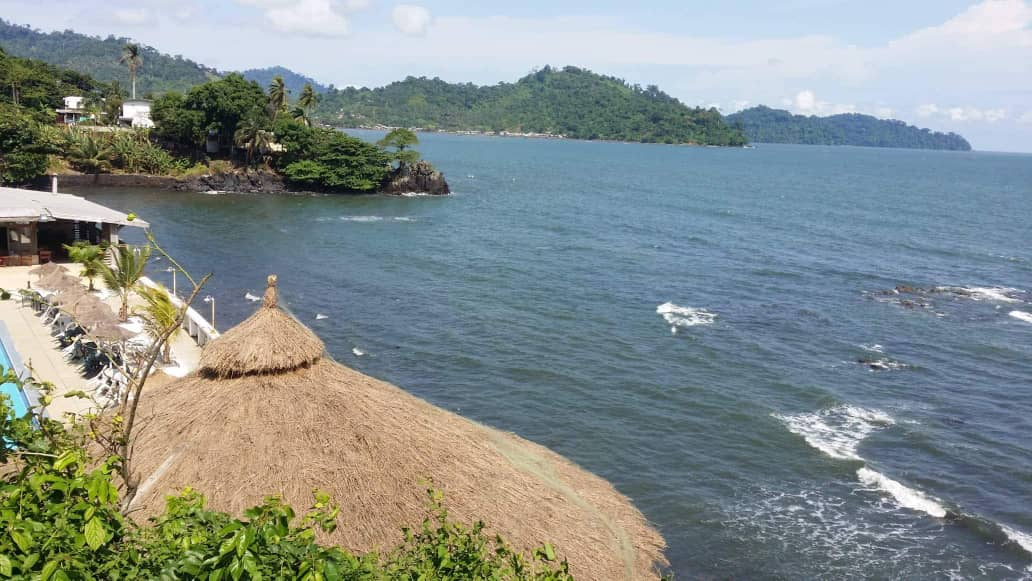
A beautiful tourist site in Limbe with thatched roof huts

Limbe was recently acknowledged by the Cameroonian government for its role in the trade of slaves. The current site (Bimbia) is being restored for tourists, who would like to understand how slaves made their way from far distances to the coastal city.

== Language ==
The Southwest Province's official language is English, although French is spoken due to the city's geographic proximity to Douala, where the official language is French. Most of the population speaks English and Cameroonian Pidgin English. The native language of the region is Bakweri and a smaller group from Wovia and Bimbia speak Bimbia or Isubu.

== Main sights ==
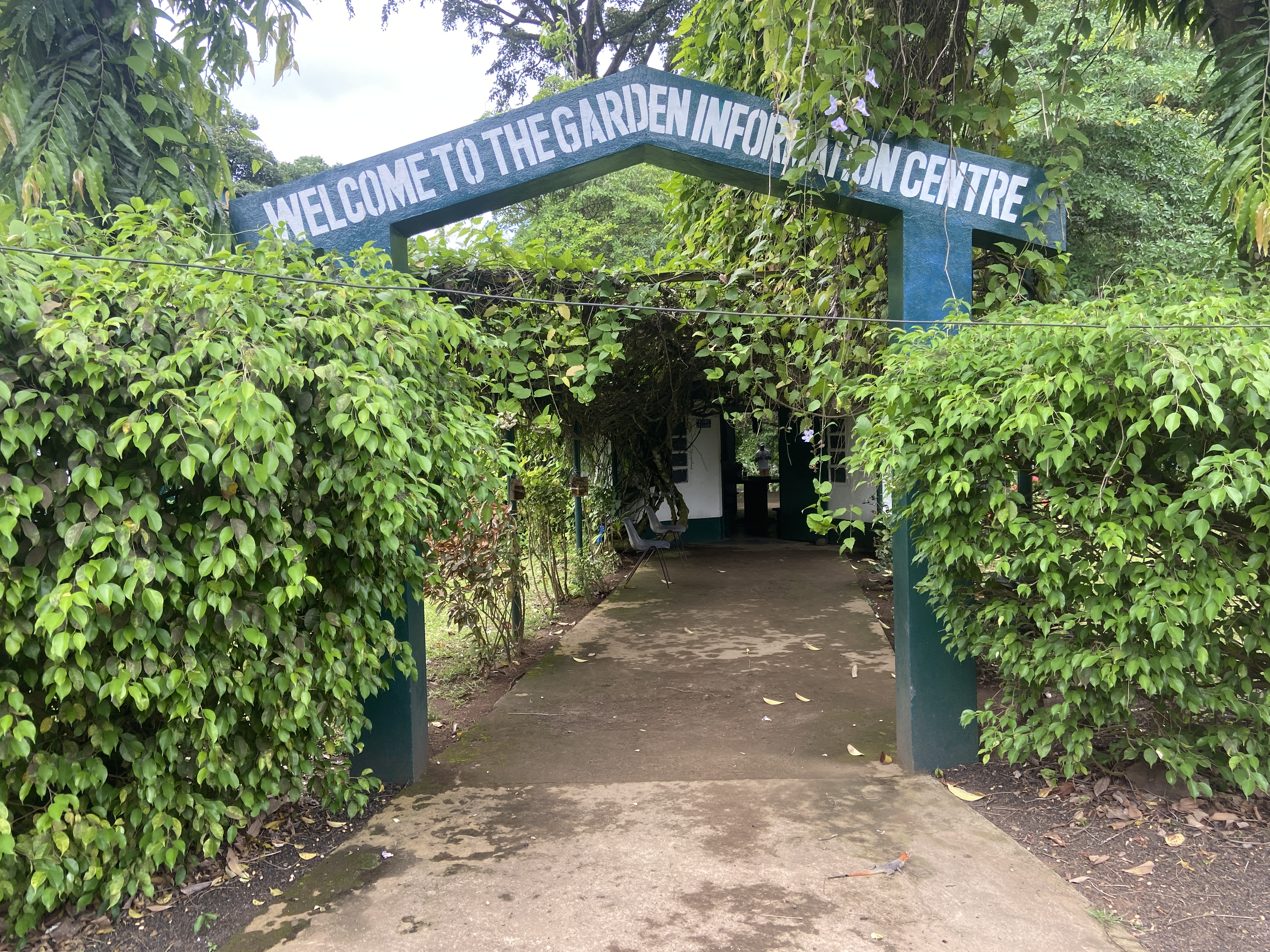
Garden Information Center - Limbe Botanic Garden.

Limbe is located on a bay against the backdrop of a major mountain range. Black sand beaches make Limbe one of two coastal towns (Kribi being the other) that are popular among Western tourists. Attractions include the Limbe Wildlife Centre and Limbe Botanical Gardens also the Bimbia slave trade route. The Germans left a Bismarck tower in the vicinity of Limbe. It is the home of the Bakweri people.

== Transport ==
Limbe was served by a terminal station of a 600 mm (1 ft 11 5/8 in) gauge plantation railway from Soppo, near Buea, of the West African Planting Society Victoria. It is linked by the National Highway 3 (N3) to Yaoundé (via Tiko, Douala and Edea) and Idenau.

Limbe is also home to a small port which offers ferry services to Calabar, Bakassi and Douala. There were plans to upgrade it to a fully equipped commercial deep sea port with the creation of the Limbe Port authority, but several delays and the ongoing Anglophone Crisis have kept the project in uncertainty (have stalled the project indefinitely).

Limbe once had an airport, the Victoria Airport , which has long gone extinct due to neglect (after unification with Cameroon) and later urbanisation in the area.

== Commerce ==
Limbe is the center of Cameroon's oil industry. Other important industries are fishery and tourism. The Port of Limbe is one of four commercial ports in Cameroon, with the port of Limbé being a member port of the International Association of Ports and Harbors (IAPH).

== Economy ==
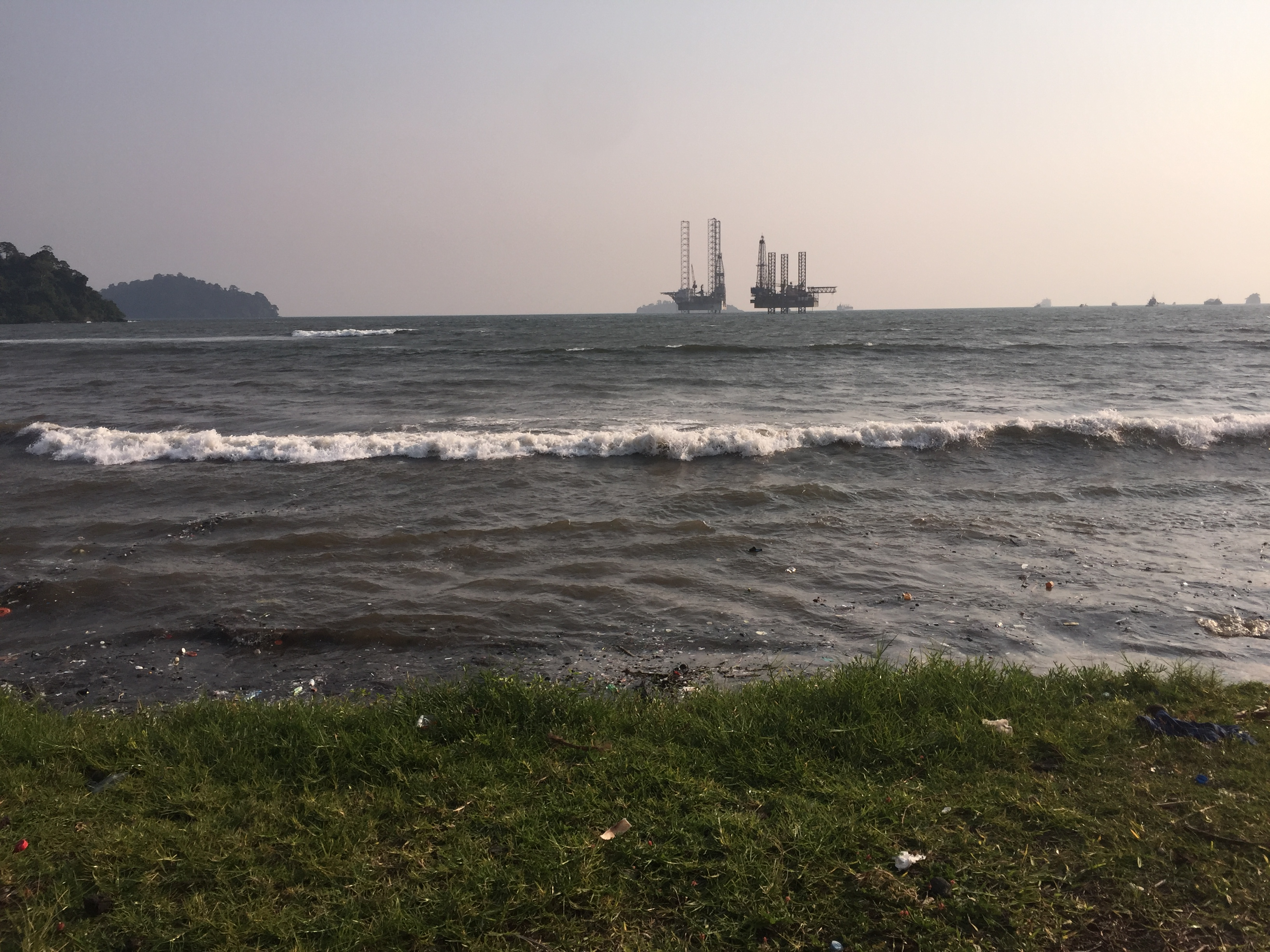
Limbe Atlantic Ocean

In 2008, Limbe became the site of a cement works. The city is also host to the head office (located at Bota, Limbe) of one of Cameroon's largest companies known as the Cameroon Development Corporation (CDC). The head office is at Bota, Limbe. Limbe has the only oil refinery company SONARA. Bundes Construction is also the largest civil engineering company. Limbe also has a non-operational natural seaport. Limbe, along with the rest of Cameroon, Central African Republic, and Chad, rely on all import/export activities through the port of Douala, the economic capital of Cameroon. Limbe, which is a viable tourist destination in Cameroon, has several tourist attractions such as the Limbe Wildlife Center, the Limbe Botanic Garden, and extensive and almost unique dark sand public and private beaches. There are several small inns and motels, including the LK Hotel, Musango Beach Hotel, Atlantic Beach, Guest House, Park and Mirama, Trinity, Savoy Palms, and First International Inn (Fini). These accommodate both business and tourist guests. Amongst these, the LK Hotel is situated above a view (mile 4) of the Atlantic Ocean, a vantage point from which to view the sunsets that envelop the Atlantic Ocean, mount Cameroon, and the Malabo Islands.

== Sport ==
Sport has a significant presence in Limbe, especially football which is the most popular sports discipline in the nation. The city is home to several football clubs such as Njala Quan Sports Academy (NQSA) founded by Mr. Henry Njala Quan, Victoria United (Commonly known as OPOPO), and Best Stars Academy. The construction of the Limbe Stadium in Limbe was planned and financed by the state-owned Chinese company, the Exim Bank of China. CNIC have also have developed the port with a breakwater and quay; provides safe haven for many oil rigs and support vessels working nearshore and offshore

== Culture ==
Limbe City Council organizes an annual Festival of Arts and Culture. This event is popularly known as Limbe FESTAC and has been taking place annually since 2014. Activities during this event include a caravan to launch the event, fashion parade, election of Miss FESTAC, exhibition, canoe race, traditional dances, display of traditional dishes, etc. It attracts visitors from all corners of the country and even from abroad. Culture from Cameroon as well as neighboring African countries are displayed.

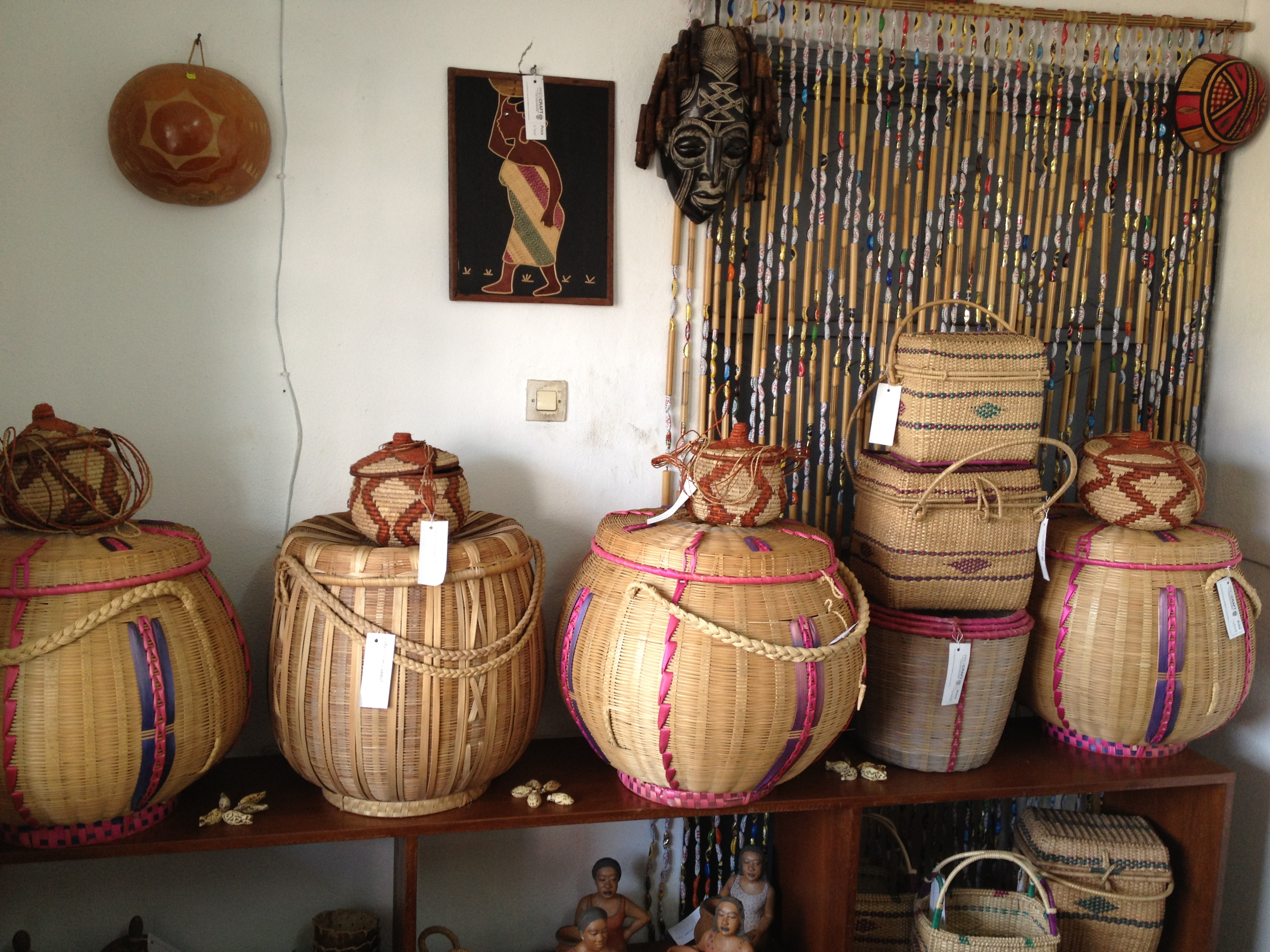
Cameroon handicraft

== Twin towns – sister cities ==
Limbe is twinned with:

- Seattle, United States
- Saint John's, Antigua and Barbuda

== See also ==
- Government Bilingual High School Limbe
- National Comprehensive High School
- Railway stations in Cameroon
- Saker Baptist College
- Westafrikanische Pflanzungsgesellschaft Victoria, headquartered in Victoria
