= Top of climb =

Type of conputed translation

In aviation, the top of climb, also referred to as the TOC or T/C, is the computed transition from the climb phase of a flight to the cruise phase, the point at which the planned climb to cruise altitude is completed. The top of climb is usually calculated by an on-board flight management system and is designed to provide the most economical climb to cruise altitude or to meet some other objective (fastest climb, greatest range, etc.). The top of climb may be calculated manually with considerable effort.

Alternatively, when manual planning and monitoring a VFR flight, TOC is an elegant and efficient way for a pilot to eliminate all the vaguery and variability of departing any airport (the turns assigned, changes of runway the pilot cannot control). TOC establishes a "starting gate" for the en route portion of a flight to allow timing and tracking along the course. A clearly determined TOC is predicated in planning along the intended route of flight far enough from the departure so that the aircraft is at altitude, on course, trimmed up in cruise flight. The variability of departure is now over and accurate tracking and monitoring of progress are beginning.

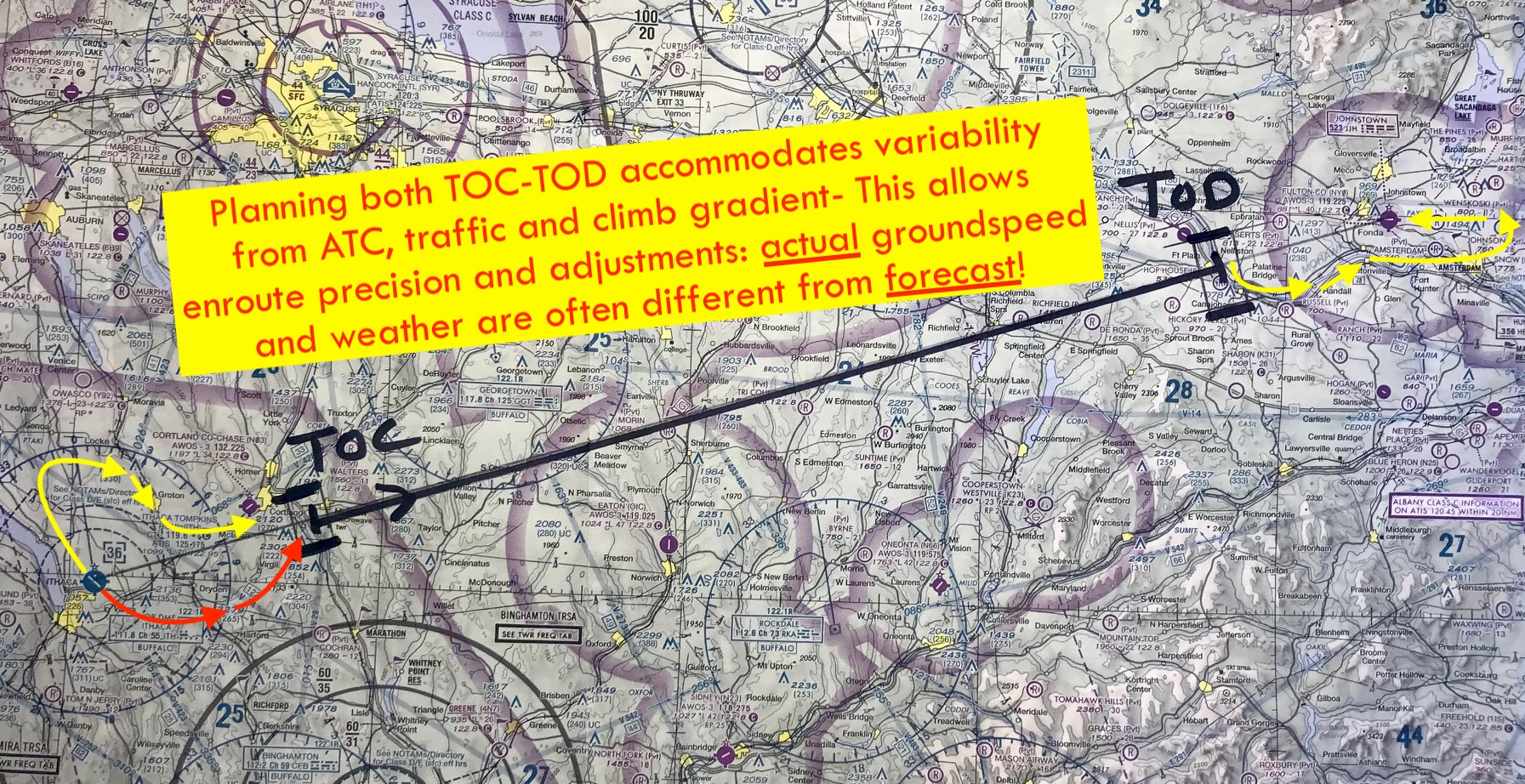
Use of TOC/TOD in VFR flight planning

Once past TOC (and by definition stabilized on course) a pilot can efficiently ascertain whether the wind and weather are "as forecast" and the groundspeed attained will allow for the safe completion of the flight "as planned" or within an acceptable margin for safety. If the forecast headwind along the route is more than was forecast and planned on the ground it should immediately be obvious and an alternate fuel stop planned to accommodate the added time aloft. Unlike when driving a motor vehicle, the aircraft's progress over the earth (groundspeed) is in every instance unique and surprising. Despite planning from forecast data, it is essential to immediately determine this in flight and adjust for variability to assure a safe outcome. Similarly, changes in visibility en route from the flight planned forecasts must be accommodated and adjusted in visual flight.

Pilots of small airplanes need to do a flight plan to compute fuel usage and time of the trip because they often don't have a flight management system. Because climbing to cruise altitude burns fuel quicker, the takeoff to cruise altitude is calculated separately. The airplane's Pilot Operating Handbook has a table of fuel burned, time, and distance to reach a given altitude from sea level. To calculate the values for airport at 900 m (3,000 ft), one must subtract the values for sea level to 900 m (3,000 ft) from the sea level to cruise altitude.

== See also ==
- Autopilot
- Top of descent
