= Top of descent =

Point of a flight where the plane starts to descend

In aviation, the top of descent, also referred to as the TOD or T/D, is the computed transition from the cruise phase of a flight to the descent phase, or the point at which the planned descent to final approach altitude is initiated. The top of descent is usually calculated by an on-board flight management system, and is designed to provide the most economical descent to approach altitude, or to meet some other objective (fastest descent, greatest range, etc.).

The top of descent may be calculated manually as long as distance, air speed, and current altitude are known. This can be done by finding the difference between current altitude and desired altitude, dividing the result by the desired rate of descent, and then multiplying that figure by the quotient of the ground speed (not airspeed) and 60:

$$\text{Top of descent} = \frac{\text{Current altitude}-\text{Desired altitude}}{\text{Rate of descent}}\times\frac{\text{Ground speed}}{60}.$$

The result dictates how far from the destination descent must begin.

== See also ==
- Flight management system
- Autopilot
- Top of climb
