= Academic ranks in Hungary =

Academic ranks in Hungary are the titles, relative importance and power of professors, researchers, and administrative personnel held in academia.

== Professorship ==
The Hungarian higher education system distinguishes two types of institutions of higher education: egyetem (university) and főiskola (college). Therefore, the requirements and also the salaries for professorships differ. The official minimum requirements of appointment are regulated according to the CCIV. act of 2011 (National Higher Education Act). The regulations of certain universities, however, may require more than the minimum.

Hierarchy of university professorships (top to bottom):

1. Egyetemi tanár, or professzor (university full professor): being nominated to the title of university professor requires PhD degree (or CSc). Habilitation (Dr. habil.) is also required unless the candidate has equivalent international experience in higher education. If a candidate fulfills these requirements, the rector (and the senate) of the university starts the process of nomination by sending the proposal to the President of Hungary via the Minister in charge of (higher) education. University professors are appointed by the President of Hungary and their appointment can only be withdrawn by the President. Attaining a professorship at a university requires such appointment beforehand. University professors may retire later than other professors: they are allowed to work until the age of 70 (as opposed to the usual age of 65).
2. Egyetemi docens (associate professor): requires doctoral degree (PhD or CSc) and a minimum of 10 years spent in higher education. However, if the candidate is a habilitated doctor, the minimum years requirement is waived. The appointment and the process remains within the university, associate professors are appointed by the rector of the university or the dean of the faculty. Some universities (e.g. ELTE) may require additional degrees (habilitation) to accept a nominee as an associate professor.
3. Egyetemi adjunktus (assistant professor): An awarded doctoral degree (PhD or CSc) is required.
4. Egyetemi tanársegéd (junior assistant professor): Appointment does not require doctoral degree (only a master's degree or equivalent), however, enrollment in a doctoral program is a requirement.

Hierarchy of college professorships (top to bottom):

1. Főiskolai tanár (college professor): Requires doctoral degree (PhD or CSc) and a minimum of 10 years of experience in higher education. If the candidate is a habilitated doctor, the minimum years requirement is waived. The process of nomination is the same as that of the university professor except that college professors are appointed by the Prime Minister of Hungary. Their appointment can also be withdrawn only by the Prime Minister.
2. Főiskolai docens (college assoc. prof.): doctoral degree (PhD or CSc) is required.
3. Főiskolai adjunktus (college assist. prof.): The candidate must be in the candidacy (ABD) phase of the doctoral program.
4. Főiskolai tanársegéd (coll. jun. assist. prof.): Requirements are the same as that of their university counterparts.

The title professor emeritus/emerita is awarded to those appointed university professors, who reached the age of retirement but are prominent scholars of their fields or have done much in favor of the university, faculty or department. Awarding such titles is at the universities' discretion.

Universities and colleges may also award honorary professorships with less strict requirements. These honorary titles are distinguished from their ordinary counterparts by placing címzetes (honorary—literally "titular") before the appropriate title.

== Overview ==
At universities (egyetem)

- Professzor emeritus (emeritus professor, always with a special habilitation, and usually with a DSc. = Doctor of Science, a National Academy awarded title)
- Egyetemi tanár (university professor, always with a special habilitation, and usually with a DSc.);
- Egyetemi docens (reader (UK)/associate professor (US)/professor, always with Ph.D.)
- Adjunktus (senior lecturer (UK)/assistant professor(US)/associate professor, always with Ph.D. since 2005 or with rank of mestertanár = "master lecturer")
- Tanársegéd (graduate teaching assistant (UK)/ instructor (US), generally without PhD.)

At college level (főiskola)

- Főiskolai tanár (college professor, always with a Ph.D., and usually with a special habilitation)
- Főiskolai docens (college reader (UK)/ college associate professor (US), usually with Ph.D.)
- Adjunktus (senior lecturer (UK)/assistant professor(US), sometimes without a Ph.D.)
- Tanársegéd (graduate teaching assistant (UK)/instructor (US), generally without Ph.D.).

Research staff at universities/institutes

- Kutatóprofesszor (honored professor with special habilitation, and usually with /minimally correspondent/ membership of the Hungarian Academy of Sciences)
- Tudományos tanácsadó (research professor with special habilitation, usually with D.Sc.)
- Tudományos főmunkatárs (honored senior research fellow with Ph.D.)
- Tudományos munkatárs (associate research fellow with Ph.D.)
- Tudományos segédmunkatárs (funded research assistant usually without Ph.D.)

Administrative ranks

- Rektor (rector - at least with a "docens" rank, usually an "egyetemi tanár" with D.Sc.)
- Rektorhelyettes (vice-rector)
- Főigazgató (deputy principal)
- Dékán (dean of faculty)
- Dékánhelyettes (vice-dean)
- Gazdasági főigazgató
- Tanszékvezető (head of department)
