= Academic ranks in Argentina =

Professors are usually categorized as "ordinario" or "concursado" (tenured, selected by a jury composed of tenured professors or other reputed authorities on the subject, after a selection process involving academic background evaluation and a public dissertation), "interino" (non-tenure, but stable position, the professor is proposed by the director of the corresponding department – sometimes after different selection processes – and accepted by the Consejo Directivo of the corresponding school), or "suplente" (substitute, hired through the same process as interinos). In most cases, classes are taught by a professorial team (a "cátedra", chair), formed by one or two professors and auxiliars, which generally also functions as a research team. Regardless of the rank, professors in public universities (and in many private ones) must perform research. This ranking system is the one used at the Universidad de Buenos Aires (the largest Argentine university) and by most of the public universities, but not all of them; being autonomous, they can choose their own scale. Private universities have their own rank in each case, sometimes based on the public university system, although as a general rule they have less ranks or hold a higher ranking as the starting point for a teaching career (devoting auxiliar ranks to undergraduates).

== Main professorships ==
- Profesor Titular Plenario Honorary degree, the professor has the same duties and rights as a Professor Titular.
- Profesor Titular
- Profesor Asociado
- Profesor Adjunto (The lowest rank for a professor to be head of a teaching team, a "cátedra").

== Other professorships ==
- Profesor Emérito a retired tenured faculty member who demonstrated excellency in both teaching and researching
- Profesor Consulto also a retired faculty member who provides assistance in specific knowledge areas
- Profesor Honorario an honorary mostly ceremonial position

Professors holding these positions usually teach upper classes, graduate classes, or do not teach (working as researchers or research advisors).

== Temporary professorships ==
- Profesor Invitado
- Profesor Contratado (for a certain period)

== Teaching auxiliaries or assistants ==
- Jefe de Trabajos Prácticos (In many universities, holding a doctorate is now a non-formal requirement for this post.)
- Ayudante Diplomado, Ayudante de Primera Categoría, Ayudante Graduado, Ayudante A (Graduated)
- Ayudante de Segunda Categoría (Graduated)
- Ayudante Alumno / Ayudante B (for undergraduate students)

== See also ==
- List of academic ranks
