= SIGWX =

Significant weather chart

SIGWX is a Significant Weather Chart defined by ICAO.

Weather charts being issued by World Area Forecast Centres (from meteorological offices in London and Washington), presenting the most important meteorological phenomena relevant especially for air traffic transport. WAFC publishes them in two formats

- BUFR code
- PNG images

Charts are typically being issued every six hours (0, 6, 12, 18 UTC). The SIGWX charts only show the forecast for the specific hour, however it is common place for parameters such as the JetStream, CAT & CB to be interpreted +/- 3 hours of the chart validity time. Prognoses are typically prepared for two ranges of heights:

- SWH - High Level SIGWX (Flight level 250-630)
- SWM - Medium Level SIGWX (Flight level 100-450)

Weather phenomena:

- Cloud - including information about cloud type, height of base and top, turbulence and icing risk
- Clear Air Turbulence - including base and top height, strength of turbulence
- Jet Stream - including base and top height, wind speed
- Tropopause Height
- Tropical Cyclone, Sandstorm
- Volcanoes
- Frontal system

IMPORTANT NOTE: Amendment 74 to ICAO Annex 3 (effective 7 November 2007) eliminated the requirement for depiction of surface fronts and well-defined convergence zones (e.g. ITCZ) on WAFS SIGWX forecasts (in BUFR-code and PNG chart form). WAFC still publishes frontal bulletins, but they contain no data.
