= PDK =

PDK may refer to:

== Politics ==
- Democratic Party of Kosovo (Albanian: Partia Demokratike e Kosovës), a political party in Kosovo
- Kurdistan Democratic Party
- Kurdistan Democratic Party (Iran)
- Party of Democratic Kampuchea
- PDK International, an organization for educators
- The Christians (Norway) (Norwegian: Partiet De Kristne), a political party in Norway

== Places ==
- DeKalb–Peachtree Airport, Atlanta, Georgia, US
- Pind Dadan Khan, Punjab, Pakistan

== Science and technology ==
- Porsche Doppelkupplungsgetriebe, Porsche's dual-clutch transmission
- Process design kit, files for semiconductor manufacture
- Polydiketoenamine, a polymer
- Phosphoinositide-dependent kinase
- Pyruvate dehydrogenase kinase

== Other ==
- PDK (Namibian music group)
