= LR2 =

LR2 may refer to:

- Land Rover Freelander, a compact SUV
- Lego Racers 2, a 2001 video game
- LR2, a version of the General Motors 60° V6 engine
- LR-2, a Japan Ground Self-Defense Force aircraft based on the Beechcraft Super King Air
- HSARI LR2, a Chinese anti-materiel rifle; see Norinco LG5 / QLU-11
- Lunatic Rave 2 a 2008 BMS Simulator game
