= TLF =

TLF or TlF may refer to:

- TLF (band), French rap band
- Telefol language, a Papua New Guinean language
- Timing Library Format, a type of text file
- Trésor de la langue française, a French dictionary
- The Little Foundation
- Tigrayan Liberation Front of Ethiopia
- Text Layout Framework, a software library within Adobe Flex
- Total Life Forever, an album by the British band Foals
- Thallium fluoride (chemical formula TlF)
- Taiwanese Localism Front
