= BeMusic =

BeMusic may refer to:

- Be-Music Script, a file format for rhythm action games
- BeMusic, a name used by members of New Order when producing recordings by other bands
- BeMusic, a planned Internet music marketing brand for Bertelsmann
