= OEC =

OEC may refer to:

== Businesses and organisations ==
- Offshore Energy Center, sponsor of the Ocean Star Offshore Drilling Rig & Museum in Galveston, Texas, United States
- Oregon Environmental Council, an American environmental organization
- Ordre des Experts-Comptables, French association of chartered accountants
- Orion Expedition Cruises, Australian expedition cruise line
- Orissa Engineering College, Bhubaneswar, India
- Otis Elevator Company, an American company that manufactures vertical transportation systems
- Osborn Engineering Company, known as OEC, an historic British former manufacturer of motorcycles
- OEConnection, an American company that provides B2B solutions, connecting Automotive Manufacturers, Dealers and Collision & Repair shops

== Science and technology ==
- Olfactory ensheathing cells, in animals
- Oxford English Corpus, in linguistics
- Oxygen evolving complex, in plants
- .OEC, a fluid physics software file format

== Other uses ==
- Odd Eye Circle, a South Korean girl group
- Old Earth creationism, a term for several types of creationism
- Outdoor Emergency Care, a course for certification of first aid in non-urban situations
- Overseas Employment Certificate, a Philippine identity document
