= OpenCTM =

- Developer(s): Marcus Geelnard
- Initial release: 2009
- Stable release: 1.0.3 / January 15, 2010
- Written in: C
- Operating system: Windows, Mac OS X, Linux, etc.
- Type: 3D computer graphics
- License: zlib license
- Website: https://openctm.sourceforge.net/

OpenCTM is a 3D geometry technology for storing triangle-based meshes in a compact format.

== Overview ==
OpenCTM is an open source project that has evolved around a technology for compressing 3D triangle meshes. The technology is divided into three different parts:

- An open, binary file format.
- An open source software library for reading and writing OpenCTM files.
- A software tool set for converting and viewing OpenCTM files.

The triangle mesh data structure that OpenCTM uses is directly compatible with high performance graphics rendering pipelines, such as OpenGL, which makes is suitable for interactive computer graphics applications. Other application types, such as CAD/CAM tools, usually need to convert the mesh data into a custom mesh format for more efficient data handling.

OpenCTM uses a triangle index array to represent the triangle connectivity information, and several arrays for representing vertex data (vertex coordinates, normals, UV coordinates and custom vertex attributes).

== File format ==
The file format, which is binary, uses 32-bit little endian format for all integer fields, and 32-bit binary IEEE 754 format for all floating point fields (also little endian).

The file begins with a special integer identifier, 0x4D54434F, which, if interpreted as four ASCII characters, forms the string “OCTM”. Following the identifier is an integer value that specifies the file format version (the latest official file format version is 5).

The rest of the file, which is described in the file format specification, contains the triangle mesh information. This includes a compressed triangle index array and compressed vertex arrays (one array for each vertex attribute).

Due to the many steps of data processing that are required for implementing the compression, interacting with the file format directly is usually more complex than interacting with other, uncompressed triangle mesh file formats (for instance STL and PLY).

== Compression ==
The compression is based on lossless entropy reduction, by means of various differentiation operations, followed by lossless entropy coding using the LZMA compression library.

== See also ==
- List of file formats
- Lossless data compression
