= Process design kit =

Tools for modelling chip fabrication

A process design kit (PDK) is a set of files used within the semiconductor industry to model a fabrication process for the design tools used to design an integrated circuit. The PDK is created by the foundry defining a certain technology variation for their processes. It is then passed to their customers to use in the design process. The customers may enhance the PDK, tailoring it to their specific design styles and markets. The designers use the PDK to design, simulate, draw and verify the design before handing the design back to the foundry to produce chips. The data in the PDK is specific to the foundry's process variation and is chosen early in the design process, influenced by the market requirements for the chip. An accurate PDK will increase the chances of first-pass successful silicon.

== Description ==
Different tools in the design flow have different input formats for the PDK data. The PDK engineers have to decide which tools they will support in the design flows and create the libraries and rule sets which support those flows.

A typical PDK contains:

- A primitive device library
  - Symbols
  - Device parameters
  - PCells
- Verification checks
  - Design rule checking
  - Layout versus schematic
  - Antenna and electrical rule check
  - Physical extraction
- Technology data
  - Layers, layer names, layer/purpose pairs
  - Colors, fills and display attributes
  - Process constraints
  - Electrical rules
- Rule files
  - LEF
  - Tool dependent rule formats
- Simulation models of primitive devices (SPICE or SPICE derivatives)
  - Transistors (typically SPICE)
  - Capacitors
  - Resistors
  - Inductors
- Design rule manual
  - A user friendly representation of the process requirements

A PDK may also include standard cell libraries from the foundry, a library vendor or developed internally

- LEF format of abstracted layout data
- Symbols
- Liberty (.lib) files
- GDSII layout data
