= SCP-ECG =

SCP-ECG, which stands for Standard communications protocol for computer assisted electrocardiography, is a standard for ECG traces, annotations, and metadata, that specifies the interchange format and a messaging procedure for ECG cart-to-host communication and for retrieval of SCP-ECG records from the host to the ECG cart. It is defined in the joint ANSI/AAMI standard EC71:2001 and in the CEN standard EN 1064:2005.

== History ==
The SCP Standard was first developed between 1989 and 1991 during a European AIM R&D project.

== Other ECG data formats ==
DICOM, HL7 aECG, MFER (ISO 22077)
