= JAM notation =

Software and file format

JAM is both the software and file format for representing music as human-readable and human-writable text. Unlike the ABC notation, another text-based music format, that is best suitable for one-voice tunes, JAM is mainly focused on chords.

Here is an example of jam notation:

### LULLABY OF BIRDLAND

Dm7 Bm7-5 | E7   A7   | Dm7 /  | Gm7   C7
F+7 F7    | Bb+7 Bbm7 | F+7 /  | Em7-5 A7
Dm7 Bm7-5 | E7   A7   | Dm7 /  | Gm7   C7
F+7 F7    | Bb+7 Bbm7 | F+7 C7 | F+7   /

Am7-5 D7    | Gm7  /    | Gm7-5 C7 | F+7 /
Am7-5 D7    | Gm7  /    | Gm7-5 C7 | F+7 A7
Dm7   Bm7-5 | E7   A7   | Dm7   /  | Gm7 C7
F+7   F7    | Bb+7 Bbm7 | F+7   C7 | F+7

The software is proprietary, windows-only freeware.

== See also ==
- List of music software
