= Wondershare Filmora =

Video editing application

- Developer: Wondershare
- Release: 2010
- Stable release: 15.4.2
- Operating system: iOS 12 or later iPadOS 13 or later VisionOS; Android macOS 10.15 or later Windows 10 or later
- Size: 1 GB
- Available in: 25 languages
- List of languages: Arabic; Bengali language; Chinese; Dutch; English; Filipino; French; German; Hindi; Indonesian; Italian; Japanese; Korean; Malay; Marathi; Polish; Portuguese; Romanian; Russian; Spanish; Swedish; Tamil; Telugu; Thai; Vietnamese
- License: Proprietary
- Website: www.filmora.io wondershare.filmora.com

== History ==
The software was initially released as Video Studio Express in 2010. It was renamed as Wondershare Vivideo in 2011, and later Wondershare Filmora in 2015. The progtam quickly became popular because of its drag-and-drop functionality.

Wondershare later launched FilmoraGo for phones and an app intended for vloggers called Vlogit, which allowed adding quick intros and thumbnails. A more advanced version called FilmoraPro was released in 2019.

In 2022, FilmoraPro and Vlogit were discontinued and replaced by a unified Filmora app, which integrated features from both of its predecessors.

During the launch of Filmora 12 in late 2022, the software shifted to a subscription model, which resulted in controversy among its userbase.

== Reception ==
Reviews of Wondershare Filmora typically describe it as easy to use but lacking more advanced features. According to Michael Muchmore from PCMag, Wondershare Filmora is "a fast and easy way to make splashy videos," but does not provide as much control as other video editors. A review by Hans India shared this opinion, believing it to be a balance between simplicity and capability.

A review of version 14 by MovieMaker said its updated AI features made it stand out.

Shorty Awards reports that, according to G2 Crowd's 2021 Winter Report, Filmora is a leader in video editing. G2 Crowd recognized it as a leader in video editing in its 2021 Winter Report. It ranked among the Top 10 Best Video Editing Software on PC Magazine's list and was chosen as the Best Video Editing Software by Tom's Guide Software by Tom's Guide.
