= FotoInsight =

- Type: Photo processing
- Founded: 2003; 23 years ago
- Headquarters: Cambridge, United Kingdom
- Area served: UK, and over 20 countries on Continental Europe
- Key people: Klaas Brumann (Owns the controlling interest in FotoInsight)
- Website: http://fotoinsight.com/

FotoInsight is a digital photo processing service for Windows, Mac OS and Linux users that was founded in 2003 in Cambridge, England, and is Europe's largest independent photo printer.

== Overview ==
FotoInsight employs over 4,000 staff. across Europe with over 3 billion photo prints printed annually. FotoInsight's managing director Klaas Brumann owns a controlling interest in the company.

== Intel legal threat ==
In June 2005, Intel Corp's UK division threatened legal action against FotoInsight for trademark infringement due to FotoInsight's use of the name slogan "The 'INSIDE' format" which Intel argued that it had coined when it started using the slogan "Intel Inside" for computers with their processors in 1991. FotoInsight eventually backed down and changed their slogan to "FotoInsight Limited", partly on account of the differences of trademark law in over 20 EU member countries in which they were attempting to set up business. In addition, Intel's threat of legal action against FotoInsight resulted in a form of the Streisand effect for FotoInsight and resulted in a large increase of brand recognition, notoriety and business due to the press coverage of the action by Intel.

== Google Earth integration ==
FotoInsight also has the option to take images taken from Google Earth and print and ship them in individual photographic prints. FotoInsight also offers the options of taking Photographs from Google Earth and, making them into postcards or greeting cards, using other Google Earth photographs or user supplied photographs.

== See also ==
- Digital Photography
- Photographic printing
