= JEDMICS =

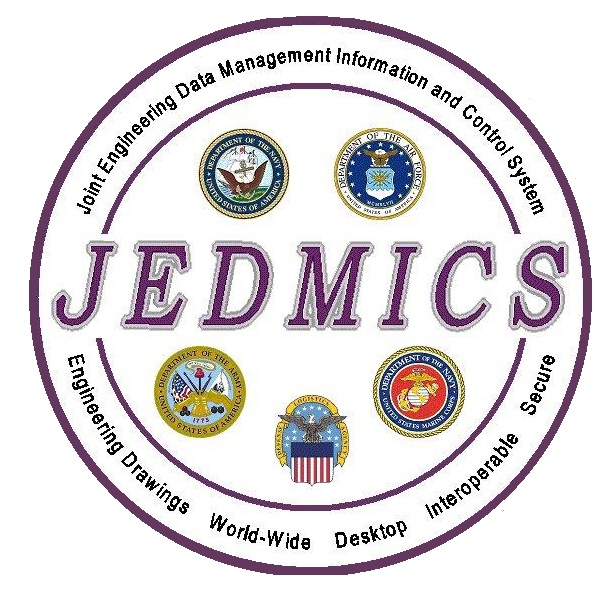
- Official JEDMICS Logo
- Founded: 23 June 1989; 36 years ago
- Country: United States of America
- Type: United States Department of Defense
- Role: Store engineering drawings in repository
- Website: www.jedmics.net

JEDMICS stands for "Joint Engineering Data Management Information and Control System”. It is a Department of Defense (DoD) initiative for the management and control of engineering drawings and related text in a standard repository. JEDMICS has been designed as an open, client-server architecture which provides the user with the ability to locate and obtain approved engineering drawings (and associated data). The system provides input services via electronic file transfer, quality assurance review of the drawings, selective retrieval of data using a relational database with built-in business rules, and digital output services.

== Capabilities ==
In addition to providing the repository functions for engineering drawings and associated technical data, JEDMICS defines the indexing elements and data relationships needed to store and locate that data. JEDMICS also provides necessary interfacing to configuration management systems that control the version and applicability of that data.

While JEDMICS can be used to create new engineering data, it is primarily intended to store data originally created by the various weapon system vendors. JEDMICS provides a centralized and secure publishing mechanism for access to this data by authorized personnel in their house and maintenance of the weapon systems as deployed within the DoD.

Drawings can be accessed from anywhere in the world through a web browser user interface. Requests for data may range from a single drawing to be used by a technician while making repairs, to thousands of drawings requested by an external configuration management system to be assembled into a bid set.

Additional Capabilities:

- Multiple Data Import Mechanisms
- Management of engineering drawings (2D / 3D) and associated documents
- Quality Assurance Logic
- Management of Technical Data Packages (Bill of Materials)
- Electronic delivery of data
- Web Services for Inter-Operability with other systems

== Additional Details ==
JEDMICS C4 and CALS are raster (bitmap) image formats developed by the US Department of Defense for military use.
