= SPC file format =

File format for spectroscopic data

The SPC file format is a file format for storing spectroscopic data.

The SPC file format is a file format in which all kinds of spectroscopic data, including among others infrared spectra, Raman spectra and UV/VIS spectra. The format can be regarded as a database with records of variable length and each record stores a different kind of data (instrumental information, information on one spectrum of a dataset, the spectrum itself or extra logs). It was invented by Galactic Industries as generic file format for its programs. Their original specification was implemented in 1986, but a more versatile format was created in 1996.

Galactic Industries was purchased by Thermo Fisher Scientific who now maintain and develop the GRAMS Software Suite for which the format was defined. They provide free tools and libraries to allow developers to create and maintain SPC files consistently.

This file format is not in plaintext, such as XML or CSV, but is a binary format and is therefore not readable with a standard text editor but requires a special reader or software to interpret the file data. Several tools exist:

- The Environmental Protection Agency published a free spectra reader called ShowSPC. Note: this tool likely does not work on modern computers.
- SPC2CSV is a free SPC to CSV converter by AnalyzeIQ
- The open-source project OpenSpectralWorks is a free reader
- SpectraGryph has analytic and display capabilities for reading and working with SPC files.
- Essential FTIR
- The Python library spc
- The R package hyperSpec
