= Sage 200 =

Set of accountancy and management products developed by Sage Group

- Developer: Sage Group
- Initial release: April 2002; 23 years ago
- Stable release: 2019
- Operating system: Microsoft Windows
- Type: Accounting software
- License: Proprietary
- Website: sage.com

Sage 200 is a set of accountancy and management products developed by Sage Group aimed at medium enterprises. Sage offer different products under the Sage 200 name in different regions. The product name originally derives from the UK and Ireland version of the product where the number 200 indicated that it was aimed at companies with 200 employees. It is designed as a highly customisable modular product.

== UK/Ireland version ==
The Sage 200cloud product in the UK and Ireland has its roots in a product called Sky accounting in the 1980s. Sky Software Limited was acquired by Sagesoft in October 1988. Sky was renamed as Sage Sovereign in 1991, and later Sage Line 100. Sovereign development was based in Bromsgrove, Worcestershire until 1991 when the team moved to the location of Sage's headquarters in Newcastle upon Tyne. Sovereign used a proprietary language called Retrieve 4GL that allowed third parties to extend the application. In the 1990s the London Stock Exchange listed company were using Sovereign for producing their own company's financial accounts. In the 1990s a Microsoft Windows version of Sovereign was produced alongside the DOS and UNIX versions.

The current Sage 200cloud product was released in April 2002 as Sage MMS (Mid Market Software) before being renamed as Sage 200 in 2007. With added cloud functionality the product gained its Sage 200cloud name in 2017. The UK/Ireland Sage 50cloud products are developed in Newcastle upon Tyne, England. The product uses Microsoft SQL Server as its database and is built on Microsoft .NET frameworks.

== Spanish version ==
The Spanish version of the product is called Sage 200 Advanced Edition.

== South African version ==
The South African version is called Sage 200 Evolution.

== Swiss version ==
The Swiss version of the product is called Sage 200 Extra.
