= Polydiketoenamine =

Class of polymers

Polydiketoenamine (PDK) is a polymer discovered in 2019 that can be recycled over and over without loss of performance. It is obtained from carboxylic acids and polyamides. The compound contains a cross-linked network which gives it the properties of higher performance and chemical resistance. The mechanical reprocessing of PDK is done without degrading its properties or performance. When the compound is under a substantial amount of heat, the total number of bonds remain constant; therefore, under heat bonds will break and make to reform. Researchers at Lawrence Berkeley National Laboratory studied PDK and published the results in Nature Chemistry in April 2019. Submersion in an acidic solution breaks down the polymer to its original monomers and separates the monomers from additives.

== See also ==
- Enamine
