= BCI2000 =

Brain–computer interface software

- Release: January 2001; 25 years ago
- Written in: C++
- Operating system: Windows, OS X, Linux
- License: GNU General Public License
- Website: www.bci2000.org

BCI2000 is a software suite for brain–computer interface research. It is commonly used for data acquisition, stimulus presentation, and brain monitoring applications. BCI2000 supports a variety of data acquisition systems, brain signals, and study/feedback paradigms. During operation, BCI2000 stores data in a common format (BCI2000 native or GDF), along with all relevant event markers and information about system configuration. BCI2000 also includes several tools for data import/conversion (e.g., a routine to load BCI2000 data files directly into Matlab) and export facilities into ASCII.

BCI2000 is available free of charge for research and education purposes.

== History ==
BCI2000 has been in development since 2000 in a project led by the Brain–Computer Interface R&D Program at the Wadsworth Center of the New York State Department of Health in Albany, New York, with substantial contributions by the Institute of Medical Psychology and Behavioral Neurobiology at the University of Tübingen. Large contributions have also been from other laboratories, notably the BrainLab at Georgia State University in Atlanta, Georgia, and Fondazione Santa Lucia in Rome, Italy.

The first successful BCI2000-based experiment took place in July 2001. BCI2000 V2.0 was released in January 2008, and V3.0 was released in February 2011. Currently, the BCI2000 project is supported by a R01 grant from the NIH (NIBIB) to Gerwin Schalk; it was previously supported by a bioengineering research partnership (BRP) grant from the NIH (NIBIB/NINDS) to Jonathan Wolpaw.

=== Documentation ===
Comprehensive documentation on the BCI2000 system can be found on the BCI2000 Wiki. This documentation contains user tutorials, a comprehensive user reference, technical reference, programming reference, and description of user contributions. A 2010 book "A Practical Guide to Brain–Computer Interfacing with BCI2000" authored by Gerwin Schalk and Juergen Mellinger, the chief software architect of the project, was published as an introductory guide to BCI2000. It contains information on the modules provided with BCI2000 and instructions on common application tasks, such as real-time spelling with P300 spellers or offline Matlab analysis.

== Dissemination ==
BCI2000 has been used in a number of publications and studies internationally. The original paper describing the BCI2000 system has been cited more than 2000 times, while the system has been used in over 120 peer-reviewed publications. BCI2000-based systems have been used by severely disabled individuals, commonly from ALS or other causes of locked-in syndrome, for word processing, email, environmental control, and communication.

BCI2000 was also used in the experiment at the University of Washington that was the first to successfully transmit brain signals over the internet.

=== Workshops ===
The BCI2000 project has organized a number of workshops on the theory and application of the platform, occurring approximately once a year since 2005.

== Platforms ==
BCI2000 is available as precompiled Windows executables or as source code, which is officially supported for compilation on the following platforms:

- Windows - XP, Vista, 7, and 8
- OS X - OS X Leopard and Snow Leopard
- Unix - Executable tests have passed on x86 and amd64 architectures running Debian

== See also ==
- Brain–computer interface
- Electrocorticography
- Electroencephalography
