= MAP (file format) =

The .MAP file extension is used for various different types of files.

== Other uses ==
- Debugging maps. These are typically plain text files that indicate the relative offsets of functions for a given version of a compiled binary.
- .map files are used on the site Azgaar's Fantasy Map Generator.
- .map files are also used by the MapInfo Professional geographic information system.
- .map files are utilised by the software package Radiant, a game mapping Software package. This software is used as part of the mod tools for multiple Call of Duty titles.
- .MAPs are also identified as color maps. An example of such software that supports .map files is SoundSpectrum's G-Force music visualizer.
- Another form of the .MAP file is for HTML image maps. An image map is formatted in HTML and creates click-able areas over a provided image.
- More generically, the .MAP extension can be used to denote any file type that indicates relative offsets from a starting point. MAP file types are used in this way, for example, when variables in software are expected to be "mapped" to a specific spot in memory.
