= Automation (video game) =

Automotive business simulation video game

Automation: The Car Company Tycoon Game
- Developer: Camshaft Software
- Publisher: Camshaft Software
- Designer: Robert Hoischen
- Programmers: Caswal Parker, Jayelinda Suridge, Isaac Blomfield
- Artists: Andrew Lamb, Hannah Grace, Casey Frost, Mathew Child
- Composer: Michael Trott
- Engine: Unreal Engine 4 (originally Kee Engine)
- Platform: Windows
- Release: WW: 12 March 2015 (Early access)
- Genre: Simulation
- Mode: Single-player

Automation: The Car Company Tycoon Game, commonly known simply as Automation, is a simulation video game developed by New Zealand-based developer Camshaft Software for Microsoft Windows that allows the player to create and run a virtual car company and design vehicles to sell. It is currently available via Steam.

== Gameplay ==
The game, currently still in early access, allows for the design, creation, testing, and sale of various vehicle platforms and drivetrains. More features will become available closer to the official release date.

There are three components to the game: engine design, car design, and a tycoon simulator. The engine design component was released first in order to drive demand for pre-orders and fund the development of the rest of the game. By April 2014, it had sold 10,000 pre-orders. In April 2015, pre-orders reached 25,000.

Car design consists of a system involving a bare, featureless car body on which fixtures such as lights and grilles can be placed. Upon placement, most fixtures will conform to the shape of the body. There is also a "3D" placement mode which allows the user to place fixtures anywhere in three-dimensional space, with the trade-off that these fixtures will not conform to the body.

The Campaign Mode spans from 1946 to 2020, tasking players with building a car company from the ground up by managing factories, researching technologies, and designing vehicles to compete across dynamically simulated market demographics. The engine designer allows players to configure cylinder count and arrangement, valvetrain type, forced induction, and fuel systems, with each choice directly affecting power, reliability, efficiency, and cost. Vehicles designed in Automation can also be exported to the separate simulation game BeamNG.drive as fully drivable cars.

== Development ==
On 25 May 2017, the first version of Automation within Unreal Engine 4 was released as an open beta. It included a host of new content and features, including a more robust paint system, more engine configurations, and most importantly, a significant graphical update. The previous version of the game, built-in Camshaft Software's own Kee Engine, is deprecated.

On 13 July 2018, an option became available to export vehicles made in Automation to BeamNG.drive as drivable vehicles.

As of 9 November 2020, more options became available in terms of customization. The "Light Campaign v4.1" update added "3D" fixture placement (wherein parts can be placed independently of the car body surface), as well as transparent windows, interior design and lighting controls.

For the "Light Campaign v4.2" update, Camshaft aimed to further rework both the business simulation aspect of the game and the way vehicles and engines are engineered. Additions included balance shafts and harmonic dampers, more turbocharger configurations, and the ability to engineer a better weight distribution into one's cars. On 22 December 2021, this update was released in an opt-in alpha form, with further work being done by Camshaft for a more stable release. The stable release occurred almost a year later on 8 December 2022, with additional features such as the "Advanced Trim Settings", which allow players to adjust the dimensions of the chassis, wheels, and engine to their liking, as well as hide certain components should they interfere with players' designs.

As of 2026, Automation is still in early access, and is also still receiving updates.
