= Survivalcraft =

Sandbox video game

- Logo
- Developer: Candy Rufus Games
- Publisher: Candy Rufus Games
- Designer: Marcin Igor Kalicinski
- Platforms: Windows Phone; Android; iOS; Microsoft Windows; Amazon Kindle Fire
- Release: 16 November 2011
- Genres: Sandbox, survival
- Mode: Single-player

Survivalcraft is a 2011 open sandbox video game developed by Marcin Igor Kalicinski under the brand Candy Rufus Games. Following early test versions of the game, it was released on 16 November 2011 for the Windows Phone, and is also available for Android, iOS, and Microsoft Windows. The game is set on a deserted island in an open world, where the player collects resources and items that can be made into survival tools. The game has six different game modes: Survival, Challenging, Cruel, Harmless, Adventure, and Creative. The first four involve the player gathering necessary resources to stay alive. Creative mode gives the player unlimited items and health, and Adventure mode is used for quest, parkour maps, and horror maps.

Kalicinski was inspired by Minecraft, and originally only worked on the game for fun, with his son as the sole pre-release tester. The game was compared to Minecraft by various reviews, with most reviews stating that the game is either better than or supplements its source of inspiration. The game became one of the most downloaded games for Windows Phone and iPad in 2013 and 2014. The sequel Survivalcraft 2 followed in December 2016, and allows players to create their own blocks.

== Gameplay ==
Players in Survivalcraft collect items and craft tools; here, a character is holding an axe with an inventory consisting of a compass, iron axe, and bomb. The player can also be seen flying, hinting that the player character is in Creative Mode.

Survivalcraft is a three-dimensional (3D) sandbox game that is set on a deserted island. The game begins with the player generating an open world, based on parameters such as the average temperature and humidity. After setting up the world, the player character is shown marooned on an island, as the crew on a nearby ship announces they will not return for them.

After the dialogue ends, the player is pushed by the necessity to collect resources and items to survive. The player may start by cutting down a tree to obtain timber and, in turn, creating a workbench, which can then be used to create more items and blocks. The items that could be crafted in the workbench, as well as the prerequired items and the methods to craft them, could be seen in the Recipaedia. The player may then use the tools to increase the hunger bar by eating food from hunting down animals, constructing a shelter for a place to sleep and spend the night, or mining to obtain underground resources. If the character does not eat food for a prolonged time, the hunger bar will drop to zero, and the character's health bar would decrease to zero. If the health bar also drops to zero, the character would die. The player also needs to craft clothes to prevent the character from freezing and depleting health bar points.

There are six different game modes in the game: Survival, Challenging, Cruel, Harmless, and Creative. In the first four, the game character starts empty-handed, and the player is challenged to stay alive on the island alone and gather necessary resources to craft items and blocks for their survival. Harmless mode makes surviving easier, with neutral animals that do not attack unless provoked and faster healing time. Challenging is the normal survival mode, with animals attacking once the character gets to a certain distance and a longer and conditional healing time. Cruel's only difference compared to Challenging is that the world is deleted if the player dies. On the other hand, Creative mode equips the player with an infinite amount of every block and items on the game. The character could fly and could not die or experience an injury while playing in this mode. In Survival mode, the player begins with fish in their inventory. The player is also able to go back to where they slept, as well. In Adventure mode, the player is unable to break blocks without using appropriate tools, being usually used for quest maps.

== Development and release ==
The game was singlehandedly developed by programmer Marcin Igor "Kaalus" Kalicinski, who sold his game under the brand Candy Rufus Games. The sole pre-release tester of the game was Kalicinski's son.

Kalicinski stated that he made the game after playing and remixing Minecraft's source code. He bought a copy of the game in July 2011 after hearing rumours about it for a long period. After playing the game and modifying the game's source code, he wrote his test code a few days later. Kalicinski stated that his code was initially intended as a "toy project"; he never thought of publishing or selling it due to the sheer amount of Minecraft duplicates that already circulated at that time. Kalicinski created the code in the C# programming language.

Kalicinski chose Windows Phone as its starting platform due to the absence of Minecraft and its clones in the platform. He had difficulties overcoming limitations for apps in the Windows Phone, such as the lack of support for shaders and the prohibition of native code. These problems made him almost abandon Survivalcraft, but he tried to run the game on the phone and it reached a rate of 4.5 frames per second on its first try. He tried to improve the game's code and managed to make the game playable. The game was submitted to the Windows Phone Store in mid-November 2011 and was released on 16 November 2011.

After its first release, Kalicinski received feedback from players regarding Survivalcraft's features. There was a huge demand by the players to make the game more similar to Minecraft. However, Kalicinski already planned the game to be more focused on the survival aspect. He wanted to make a long-term game with more features that would make the character more susceptible to death, such as cold, hunger, thirst, natural disasters, and increasingly dangerous enemies. Nevertheless, the feedback refocused him on improving the game's basic features instead of implementing his planned new features.

Following several updates, the game was released for Android devices in October 2012, and later for Microsoft Windows. An update for the game was released shortly afterwards in July 2013, with the addition of boats, farming, and new animals. The update also changed the terrain generation method, allowing islands to be found in the middle of the ocean. Another update in November 2013 added electronic functionalities in the game, allowing player to create complex visual displays.

A month after the November 2013 update, the game was released for iOS devices. Kalicinski introduced a Christmas-themed update immediately after the iOS release, which added Christmas trees and reindeer into the game. Other major changes for this update were the ability of players to alter the temperature and humidity of worlds, a new set of bows and arrows, electric shooting target, iron fences, and tigers. Kalicinski supplemented the game with another update in May 2014, which added various new weapons into the game and custom skins for players. Kalicinski implemented several alterations regarding the audio, user interface, and explosives in this update.

The 30th and last update of Survivalcraft were released in March 2016. The update added many new items and blocks into the game, such as copper items, stairs, and coloured LEDs. Several tweaks on the area of forest and caves were also conducted in its final update.

=== Survivalcraft 2 ===
Survivalcraft 2 is a sequel to the original game which was released in December 2016. The main feature that separates Survivalcraft 2 from its predecessor is the existence of "furnitures", a system that allows players to make their own block by using an in-game tool called an iron hammer. An update for Survivalcraft 2 added split screen—a long-awaited feature—into the game. The split screen system works by dividing the screen for 2-4 players, allowing up to 4 players to use the same device to play in the same world.

== Reception ==
=== Sales and accolades ===
Survivalcraft fared well on Windows Phone and iPad, with the game becoming the 15th most popular game and the 7th most popular game in the Action & Adventure section a week following its first release. After the game was released on iPad, the game became one of the two top 50 grossing games in 2013 that has no in-game purchases. The next year, the game became the 5th most downloaded paid app on iPad. The game was later named by Touch Arcade as one of the best iPhone and iPad games of 2013 and the 100 Best Mobile Games of 2016.

=== Critical response ===
Reception

Aggregate score
Aggregator	Score
Metacritic	74/100

Review scores
Publication	Score
Gamezebo	2.5/5
Pocket Gamer	3.5/5
TouchArcade	5/5

The game received "mixed or average reviews" based on four critic reviews, according to review aggregator Metacritic. The game received polarized reviews by video game critics, though most opined that the game is either better than or supplements its source of inspiration. Jared Nelson of mobile game news site Touch Arcade argued that the game is superior to its source of inspiration, Minecraft, in every aspect. He describes the game as giving him a "sense of adventure". He stated that the game's infinite world area, cave generation system, and world sharing—which did not exist in Minecraft at that time—made the game better than its source of inspiration. Nelson also praised the fact that that game is made by a single person, as opposed to the "unlimited money and resources" that the developers of Minecraft had. A similar review was delivered by Slide to Play reviewer Nadia Oxford, who claimed that those who considered Survivalcraft "as a mere Minecraft clone" were shallow. However, Oxford pointed out that the game's block placement is difficult for those who have not mastered Minecraft. She described the game as a reminder of how human ancestors survived in the past and considered that the game is better suited for "Minecraft veterans".

148Apps reviewer Rob Rich compares features in Survivalcraft that were or were not available in Minecraft. Rich praised the game's variety of animals and the in-game panorama. Nonetheless, he pointed the absence of things that already existed in Minecraft, such as armour, farming, and multiplayer. Rich also complained about the minuscule size of the movement stick. Deanu Haratinu from Urban Digital also commented on the movement stick, stating that it might cause some complications to users who never played a 3D game using this feature. (Note: Original text (in Indonesian): Bagi yang tidak terbiasa memainkan game 3D dengan menggunakan virtual touchpad, akan mengalami sedikit kesulitan memainkan game ini.)

Bewi from iPhone Soft reviewed the game's audio and described it as "very fair", noting the lack of melody and an emphasis on classic and realistic sound effects. (Note: Original text (in French): La bande-son est très passable étant donné qu'elle ne propose pas de mélodie, seulement des bruitages très classiques et assez réalistes.) He expressed the game as having a beneficial in-game guide with the existence of Recipaedia that allows players to search every item or block that existed in the game as well as how to make it. (Note: Original text (in French): L'aide en jeu est bien fournie et on saluera particulièrement la présence du "Recipaedia" qui contient l'ensemble des blocs et objets que vous pourrez trouver et fabriquer, avec les recettes pour les obtenir.)

A less favourable review was delivered by Mike Rose from Gamezebo. He described the game as a carbon copy of Minecraft and as an insult to the players and developers of Minecraft. Although he stated that Survivalcraft differs from Minecraft due to the wildlife as its focus and the community tab that allows players to see each other's world and texture, he argued that Survivalcraft is missing many features that Minecraft already had. He then recommended readers not to bother with Survivalcraft and concluded that the game's only advantage was as "a perfectly playable Minecraft clone".
