= OE-Cake! =

2D fluid physics sandbox software

- Developer(s): Prometech Software, Inc.
- Initial release: March 28, 2008; 17 years ago
- Operating system: Microsoft Windows
- Website: www.prometech.co.jp

OE-Cake, OE-CAKE! or OE Cake is a 2D fluid physics sandbox application used to demonstrate the multi-physics simulation of the Octave Engine created by Prometech Software Inc. It was one of the first engines with the ability to realistically process water and other materials in real-time. In the program, which acts as a physics-based paint program, users can insert objects and see them interact under the laws of physics. It has advanced fluid simulation, and support for gases, rigid objects, elastic reactions, friction, weight, pressure, textured particles, copy-and-paste, transparency, foreground and background images, and easy file sharing.

OE-Cake was a casual/freeware version of the no-longer available PhysiCafe program marketed towards professional use, which was a Japanese language application utilizing the same engine.

The name OE-Cake comes from the name of the engine and the word "cake" loosely means "draw" in Japanese; its name therefore means "OctaveEngine Draw".

The developers of OE-Cake left Prometech Software Inc., and went on to form their own company, Phyzios Inc. They developed a web-app, Phyzios Studio, which lasted for a short time before being discontinued.

== File format ==
OE-Cake uses the .OEC file format for saving scenes made using the program. In OE-Cake version 1.1b, the file format was changed. Version 1.0b files can be opened with version 1.1.2b. Version 1.1.2b files cannot be properly opened in version 1.0b.

OE-Cake files are stored in plaintext format, which makes them easy to share, small in size, and allows copying and pasting of particles and modify the behaviour of the engine.

OE-Cake supports changing of the Parameters that define the physics and other behaviours in the game. To change these parameters, open an OE-Cake save with a text editor, scroll to the bottom, and change the values of a variable to change the behaviour of the game.
