= LEF/DEF =

Integrated circuit layout file format standard

LEF/DEF or Library Exchange Format and Design Exchange Format is an accepted standard representing the physical layout of an integrated circuit in an ASCII format. It is a pair of formats, LEF and DEF, commonly used in conjunction. They are supported by Cadence Design Systems and distributed by Si2 under the Apache-2.0 permissive free-software license. Their most common use is place and route (P&R) tools.

The DEF file contains all information related to the particular electronic circuit design: design constraints, layout, netlist. The LEF file contains library information related to cells and modules used in the design, as well as information about layers, vias, P&R boundary and some other information useful for P&R.

LEF and DEF were developed at Tangent Systems by Aki Fujimura for their place and route tools, which were bought by Cadence in 1989.

== See also ==
- OpenROAD Project
