= List of filename extensions (M–R) =

This alphabetical list of filename extensions contains extensions of notable file formats used by multiple notable applications or services.

== M ==
Ext.	Description	Used by
M	Mathematica Package File	Mathematica
M	MATLAB M-File	MATLAB
M	Mercury Source File	Mercury
M	Source code	Objective-C
M2TS	BDAV MPEG-2 transport stream	
M3U	MPEG Audio Layer 3 Uniform Resource Locator playlist	Media players
M3U8	MPEG Audio Layer 3 Uniform Resource Locator playlist, using UTF-8 encoding	Media players
M4A	MPEG-4 Part 14 audio	iTunes Store
M4P	DRM-encumbered MPEG-4 Part 14 media	iTunes Store (formerly)
M4R	See M4A	Apple iPhone ringtones
M4V	MPEG-4 Part 14 video, which may optionally be encumbered by FairPlay DRM	iTunes Store, HandBrake
M64	Mupen64 gameplay recording	Mupen64
MA	Autodesk Maya scene description format. The native format of the Maya modeling, animation, and rendering software.	
MAT	MATLAB MAT-files. The native data format of the MATLAB numerical computation software. Stores numerical matrices, Boolean values, or strings. Also stores sparse arrays, nested structures, and more.	MATLAB and Octave
MBOX	Unix mailbox format. Holds a collection of email messages. Native archive format of email clients such as Unix mail, Thunderbird, and many others.	
MCADDON	A zip file that contains .mcpack or .mcworld files to modify Minecraft: Bedrock Edition generally used to distribute add-ons to other users.	Minecraft: Bedrock Edition
MCMETA	A Minecraft custom resource pack configuration file.	Minecraft: Bedrock Edition
MCFUNCTION	A Minecraft datapack function file for executing in-game scripts with the built-in command system.	Minecraft: Java Edition
MCPACK	A zipped resource or behavior pack that modifies Minecraft: Bedrock Edition, typically used to transfer resources between users.	Minecraft: Bedrock Edition
MCPROJECT	Minecraft Bedrock Editor's filetype. Files of this type only open in Editor and are capable of containing Editor extensions.	Minecraft: Bedrock Edition
MCSTRUCTURE	Contains a Minecraft structure such as a building or natural feature, saved using the Structure Block tool can be shared between players, allowing the sharing of each other's structures.	Minecraft: Bedrock Edition
MCTEMPLATE	A zip archive containing the template of a world used in Minecraft.	Minecraft: Bedrock Edition
MCWORLD	A zip archive that contains all the files needed to load a Minecraft: Bedrock Edition or Minecraft Education world, for example .dat and .txt files.	Minecraft: Bedrock Edition
MCF	Multimedia Container Format (predecessor of Matroska)	
MD	Markdown-formatted text file	Markdown
MDB	MDB database file. The native format of the Microsoft Access database application. Used in conjunction with the Access relational database management system and as an exchange format.	Microsoft Access
MDF	Master Data File, a Microsoft SQL Server file type	Microsoft SQL Server
MDF	Measurement Data Format, a binary file format for vector measurement data	automotive industry, developed by Robert Bosch GmbH
MDI	Document save in high-resolution, created by MSOffice to scan documents (OCR) and turn them into a .DOC	Microsoft Office
MDG	Digital Geometry (Programmable CAD) file format, developed by DInsight	Digital Geometric Kernel
MDL	Model	3D Design Plus or Simulink
MDL	3D model container file that contains .smd and .qc files	Source engine games
MDMP	Microsoft minidump file created by Windows when a program crashes	Microsoft Windows SDK
MDS	Midi Session	Sound Imp.
MEX	MEX file (executable command)	Matlab
MGF	Wolfram System MGF bitmap format. Used by the Wolfram System user interface for storing raster images. MGF is an acronym for Mathematica Graphics Format.	
MGF	Materials and Geometry Format	
MHT	MIME encapsulation of aggregate HTML documents	Web browsers
MID	Standard MIDI file	Music synthetizers, Winamp
MKA	Matroska audio	
MKV	Matroska video	
mlx	MATLAB live script file	MATLAB
MM	Source code	Objective-C++
MLGP	Mindustry logic processor file	Mindustry
MML	MathML mathematical markup language. Used for integrating mathematical formulas in web documents. Rendering of embedded MathML is supported by a number of browsers and browser additions.	
MNT	Surface metrology or image analysis document	MountainsMap
MO	Modelica models. File format specified by the Modelica Association.	
MOBI	eBook	Mobipocket, Kindle
MOD	AMPL model file	AMPL
MOD	Modula language source	
MOD	Modula-2 source code file	Clarion Modula-2
MOD	Tracker file format created for Ultimate Soundtracker for the Amiga	MOD (file format)
MOD	MOD is recording format for use in digital tapeless camcorders.	MOD and TOD
MODULES	Module	GTK+
MOE	same as Modelica Model .mo.	
MOL	MDL Molfile	RasMol
MOL2	Tripos Sybyl MOL2 Format	SYBYL, RasMol
MOP	MOPAC input file	MOPAC, RasMol
MOV	Animation format (Mac)	QuickTime, AutoCAD AutoFlix
MP2	MPEG audio file	Winamp, xing
MP3	MPEG audio stream, layer 3	AWAVE, CoolEdit(+PlugIn), Winamp, many others
MP4	multimedia container format, MPEG 4 Part 14	Winamp
MPA	MPEG audio stream, layer 1,2,3	AWAVE
MPC	Musepack audio	
MPD	LDraw file (multi-part DAT file)	LDraw
MPEG	multimedia containter format, video, audio	MPEG Player, Winamp
MPG	see MPEG	
MPS	MPS linear programming system format (.mps) Commonly used as input format by LP solvers. MPS is an acronym for Mathematical Programming System.	
MR	A Engine Simulator engine save file	Engine Simulator
MRSH	MarsShell Script File	MarsShell (mrsh)
MSC	management saved console	Microsoft; Microsoft MMC
MSCZ	File type used by Musescore when saving a score	
MSAV	Mindustry map file	Mindustry
MSCH	Mindustry schematic file	Mindustry
MSDL	Manchester Scene Description Language	
MSF	Multiple sequence file (Pileup format)	
MSI	Windows Installer Package	Microsoft Windows
MSO	Microsoft Outlook metadata for a Microsoft Word 2000 email attachment	Microsoft Outlook
MSSTYLES	Windows visual style file	Microsoft Windows
MSU	Microsoft Update Package	Microsoft Windows
MTS	See M2TS	
MUP	MUP -- File type used by MindMup to export editable Mind Maps	
MM	File type used by FreeMind to export editable Mind Maps	
MX	Wolfram Language serialized package format (.mx) Wolfram Language serialized package format. Used for the distribution of Wolfram Language packages. Stores arbitrary Wolfram Language expressions in a serialized format optimized for fast loading.	
MXF	Material exchange format (RFC 4539, SMPTE 377M)	
MYD	a MyISAM data file in MySQL	MyISAM, MySQL
MYI	a MyISAM index file in MySQL	MyISAM, MySQL

== N ==
Ext.	Description	Used by
NB	Wolfram Mathematica Notebook (see Wolfram Language)	Mathematica
NC	Binary Data	netCDF software package
NC	Instructions for NC (Numerical Control) machine	CAMS
NC	Name code program	namec-git/namec software package
NCD	NC Drill File (Excellon Format, printed circuit board hole definitions)	Most PCB layout software
NCP	Nikon Picture Control file	Nikon cameras
NDF	Nikon file created by Image Dust Off ref photo	Nikon cameras
NDK	NDK seismologic file format. Commonly used for storage and exchange of earthquake data. Stores geographical information and wave measurements for individual seismological events.	
NDS	Nintendo DS file. Used for Homebrew and official games.	Nintendo DS consoles and emulators
NEF	Nikon Electronic Format, Nikon's RAW image format	Nikon cameras
NEO	Text file; media	
NET	Pajek graph data format (.net) Pajek graph language and data format. Commonly used exchange format for graphs. The native format of the Pajek network analysis software. The format name is Slovenian for spider.	Pajek network analysis software
NEU	Pro/Engineer neutral file format	PTC Pro/Engineer
NEV	Nikon raw video file	Nikon cameras
NEX	NEXUS phylogenetic format (.nex, .nxs) Commonly used for storage and exchange of phylogenetic data. Can store DNA and protein sequences, taxa distances, alignment scores, and phylogenetic trees.	
NF	Instructions for NC machine made by TRUMPF	TRUMPF
NFO	iNFO for accompanying media files	Kodi, Plex
NIM	Nim source code file	Nim
NMF	Node Map File	Used by SpicyNodes
NMS	Nikon IPTC camera import file	Nikon cameras
NOFF	3D object file format with normals (.noff, .cnoff) NOFF is an acronym derived from Object File Format. Occasionally called CNOFF if color information is present.	
NP2	Nikon Picture Control file	Nikon cameras
NP3	Nikon Picture Control file for the Z9 generation cameras	Nikon cameras
NPR	Nuendo Project File	Steinberg Nuendo
NRO	Nintendo Switch executable file	
NRW	Nikon Coolpix RAW image	Nikon
NRX	NetRexx Script File	NetRexx
NS1	NetStumbler file	NetStumbler
NSA	media	Nullsoft Streaming Audio
NSF	NES sound format file	Transfer of NES music data
NSP	Nintendo Switch eShop format	Nintendo Switch, Ryujinx
NSV	media	Nullsoft Streaming Video
NUMBERS	Numbers spreadsheet file	Numbers
NWD, NWF	Navisworks 3D drawing	Navisworks
NXS	Same as NEXUS (.nex, .nxs). See NEX above for more details. NEXUS phylogenetic format (.nex, .nxs)	

== O ==
Ext.	Description	Used by
O	Object file	UNIX - Atari - GCC
O5C	OpenStreetmap packed changeset	OpenStreetMap
O5M	OpenStreetmap packed data	OpenStreetMap
OBJ	Compiled machine language code	
OBJ	Object code	Intel Relocatable Object Module
OBJ	Wavefront Object	
OBS	Script	ObjectScript
OCX	OLE custom control	
ODB	Database front end document	OpenDocument, LibreOffice
ODF	Formula, mathematical equations	OpenDocument, LibreOffice
ODG	Drawings and vector graphics	OpenDocument, LibreOffice, Collabora Online
ODP	Presentations	OpenDocument, LibreOffice, Collabora Online
ODS	OpenDocument spreadsheet format (.ods)	OpenDocument, LibreOffice, Collabora Online
ODT	Text (Word processing) documents	OpenDocument, LibreOffice, Collabora Online
OFF	3D object file format (.off, .coff) OFF is an acronym for Object File Format. Used for storing and exchanging 3D models.	
OGA	Audio file in the Ogg container format	libogg
OGG	Vorbis audio in the Ogg container format	libogg
OGV	Video file in the Ogg container format	libogg
OGX	Ogg Multiplex Profile	libogg
OMA	OpenStreetMap packed data	OpenStreetMap
OPL	OpenStreetMap line-separated data	OpenStreetMap
OPUS	Ogg/Opus audio file	mpv, mplayer, many others (official file format).
ORG	Emacs Org mode	Emacs Org mode major mode
ORG	Older Origin Project	Origin versions 4 or earlier
OSB	Osu! Storyboard	Osu!
OSK	Osu! Skin	Osu!
OSM	OpenStreetMap XML data	OpenStreetMap
OSMCHANGE	OpenStreetMap XML changeset	OpenStreetMap
OSR	Osu! Replay	Osu!
OST	Offline Storage Table	Microsoft e-mail software: Outlook Express, Microsoft Outlook
OSU	Osu! Beatmap Info	Osu!
OSZ	Osu! Beatmap	Osu!
OTB	Over-the-air bitmap graphics	
OTF	OpenType font	
OTL	The Vim Outliner	A vim plugin
OTF	Formula, mathematical equations template	OpenDocument, LibreOffice, Collabora Online
OTG	Drawings and vector graphics template	OpenDocument, LibreOffice, Collabora Online
OTP	Presentations template	OpenDocument, LibreOffice, Collabora Online
OTS	Spreadsheets template	OpenDocument, LibreOffice, Collabora Online
OTT	Text (Word processing) documents template	OpenDocument, LibreOffice, Collabora Online
OV2	Overlay file (part of program to be loaded when needed)	TomTom Point of Interest
OWL	Web ontology language (OWL) file	Protégé and other ontology editors
OXT	OpenOffice.org extension	OpenOffice.org / LibreOffice

== P ==
Ext.	Description	Used by
P	Database Progress source code	Progress
P	Pascal source code file	
P	Parser source code file	
P8	PICO-8 game file	PICO-8
P10	Certificate Request	
P12	Personal Information Exchange	"Crypto Shell Extensions"
PACK	Pack200 Packed Jar File	
PAGES	Pages document file	Pages
PAK	Archive	Pak
PAL	Paint Shop Pro color palette (JASC format)	PaintShop Pro, XnView
PAM	PAM Portable Arbitrary Map graphics format	Netpbm
PAPA	Flipline Studio's game backups like JackSmith, Papa's Wingeria version 1.2+, Papa's Pancakeria version 1.4+	
PAR	Parity Archive	
PAR2	Parity Archive v2	
PARAMS	MXNet net representation format (.json, .params) Underlying format of the MXNet deep learning framework, used by the Wolfram Language. Networks saved as MXNet are stored as two separate file: a .json file specifying the network topology and a .params file specifying the numeric arrays used in the network.	
PAS	Pascal language source	Borland Pascal
PAX	pax archive file	pax, GNU Tar
PBLIB	Power Library	PowerBASIC
PBF	OpenStreetMap Protobuf-encoded data	OpenStreetMap
PBM	ASCII portable bitmap format (.pbm) PBM monochrome raster image format. Member of the Portable family of image formats. Related to PGM and PPM. Native format of the Netpbm graphics software package.	Netpbm graphics software package
PBO	A file type used by Bohemia Interactive	Arma 3, PBO Manager
PCAP	Network packet capture format (.pcap)	WireShark
PCF	Profile configuration file	Cisco Systems VPN Client
PCL	HP-PCL graphics data file	HP Printer Command Language
PCS	PCSurvey file	PCSurvey by Softart - land surveying software
PCX	PC Paintbrush file	PC Paintbrush
PDB	debugging data	Microsoft Windows
PDB	Molecule (protein data bank)	
PDE	Processing source code file	Processing programming language
PDF	Adobe's Portable Document Format	Adobe Acrobat Reader
PDI	Portable Database Image	
PDM	Program	Deskmate
PDM	PowerDesigner's physical data model (relational model) file format	PowerDesigner
PDM	Visual Basic (VB) Project Information File	Visual Basic
PDN	Image file	Paint.NET
PDS	PALASM Design Description	
PDS	Planetary Data System Format	
PEM	A text-based certificate file defined in RFC 1421 through RFC 1424	Applications that need to use cryptographic certificates, including web-servers
PET	Puppy Linux Package	Puppy Linux
PFA	PostScript Font File	
PFA	Type 3 font file (unhinted PostScript font)	
PFAM	Jalview sequence alignment format	
PFB	PostScript font	Adobe Type Manager (ATM)
PFC	(Personal Filing Cabinet) contains e-mail, preferences and other personal information	AOL
PFM	PostScript Type 1 font metric file	Microsoft Windows, Adobe Acrobat Reader
PFM	Windows Type 1 font metric file	
PGN	Portable Game Notation -Text specification for Chess game	Most chess playing computer applications
PFX	An encrypted certificate file	Applications that need to use cryptographic certificates, including web-servers
PHF	Database File	Nuverb Systems Inc: Donarius
PHN	Phun scene	Algodoo (previously Phun)
PHP	PHP file	
PHP3	PHP 3 file	
PHP4	PHP 4 file	
PHR	Phrases	LocoScript
PHY	Phylip format	
PHZ	Algodoo scene	Algodoo
PI2	Portrait Innovations High Resolution Encrypted Image file	Portrait Innovations Studio2 (proprietary)
PICKLE	Pickle file	Python pickle serialisation module (recommended file extension from Python 3.1 onwards)
PIE	GlovePIE script file	GlovePIE
PIR	PIR format	
PIT	Compressed Mac file archive created by PACKIT	unpackit.zoo
PIT	Partition Information Table for Samsung's smartphone with Android	Odin3
PK3	Quake III engine game data	
PKL	Pickle file	Python pickle serialisation module (recommended file extension until Python 3.0)
PKA	Archive	PKARC
PKG	General package for software and games	MacOS, iOS, PSVita, PS3, PS4, PS5, Symbian, BeOS...
PL	Perl source code file	
PL	Prolog source code file	
PL	IRAF pixel list	IRAF astronomical data format
PLANET	Planet Life save file	Planet Life
PLI	PL/I source file	PL/I compilers
PLR	Terraria player/character file	Terraria
PLS	Multimedia Playlist, primarily for streaming	Shoutcast, IceCast, others
PM	Perl module	
PMA	PMarc Archive	
PMP	PenguinMod Project file	PenguinMod's project file
PMS	PenguinMod sprite file	PenguinMod's file format for sprites
PMW	Paper Minecraft World	Paper Minecraft (on scratch, ported by Griffpatch) world file
PNG	Portable Network Graphics file	Web browsers, image viewing and editing applications
POM	Build manager configuration file	Apache Maven POM file
PPEG	parsimonious PEG grammar	parsimonious parser generator
PPTX	Office Open XML Presentation	Microsoft PowerPoint
PPSX	Office Open XML Auto-Play Presentation	Microsoft PowerPoint
PRJ	mkd	mkd project file to extract documentation
PROPERTIES	Configuration file format. Commonly used in Java projects. Associates string keys to string values.	
PROTO	Protocol Buffers message specification	Protobuf
PRP	Plasma Registry Page	Plasma (engine)
PS	Adobe Postscript file	PostScript
PSD	Photoshop native file format	Adobe Photoshop
PSDC	Photoshop Cloud Document	Adobe Photoshop
PSM1	Windows Powershell module	Windows Powershell
PSPPALETTE	Paint Shop Pro color palette (JASC format)	Paint Shop Pro 8.0 and newer
PST	Archive File	Microsoft Outlook
PS1	Windows Powershell script	Windows PowerShell
PTF	PlayStation Portable Theme file	PSP Theme settings menu
PTF	Pro Tools Session File	Digidesign/Avid Pro Tools version 7 up to version 9
PTS	Pro Tools Session File	Digidesign Pro Tools (legacy version)
PTX	Pro Tools Session File	Avid Pro Tools version 10 or later
PUB	Public key ring file	Pretty Good Privacy RSA System
PUP	Pileup format	
PY	Python script file	Python
PYC	Python bytecode file	Python
PYD	Python module DLL	Python on Windows
PYO	Python optimised bytecode file	Python (versions 3.4.x and older)

== Q ==
Ext.	Description	Used by
QC	Short for Quality Control or QC Script; It is a configuration/script plain text file that tells the game engine's compiler how to assemble and package .smd files.	Source Engine Games
QFX	Quicken-specific implementation of the OFX specification	Intuit Quicken
QIF	Quicken Interchange Format	Intuit Quicken
QLC	ATM Type 1 fonts script	Adobe Type Manager
QOI	Quite OK Image Format	Web browsers, image viewing and editing applications
QSS	QT Style Sheet	QT Python GUI library
QT	QuickTime movie (animation)	
QTVR	QuickTime VR Movie	

== R ==
Ext.	Description	Used by
R	Ratfor file	Ratfor
R	Script file	R
R00, R01, ...	Part of a multi-file RAR archive	RAR
R2D	Reflex 2 datafile	Reflex 2
R3D	Red Raw Video (raw video data created with a Red camera)	Red Camera
R8P	PCL 4 bitmap font file	Intellifont
RAD	2-op FM music	Reality AdLib Tracker
RAD	Radiance	Radiance
RAL	Remote Access Language file	Remote Access
RAM	Ramfile	RealAudio
RAP	Flowchart	RAPTOR
RAR	Archive	RAR
RAS	Graphics format	SUN Raster
RB	Ruby Script file	
RBXL	Roblox Experience file	Roblox Studio
RC	Configuration file	emacs, Vim (text editor), Bash (Unix shell)
RC	Resource Compiler script file	Microsoft C/C++, Borland C++
RDP	RDP connection	Remote Desktop connection
RDS	Data file	R
RES	Compiled resource	Microsoft C/C++, Borland C++
REX, REXX	Rexx Script file	ooRexx
RKT	Racket language source file	DrRacket integrated development environment (IDE) for the Racket (programming language)
RM	RealMedia	RealPlayer
RMD	R Markdown	RStudio
RMGC	RootsMagic database file, for versions 1 through 7	RootsMagic
RMTREE	RootsMagic database file, for versions greater than 7	RootsMagic
RMVB	RealMedia Variable Bitrate	RealPlayer
Rob	Robot4 (TM) Input file format	Robot4 software
ROL	AdLib Piano Roll	AdLib Visual Composer
RPM	RPM software package	Red Hat Linux, the Linux Standard Base and several other operating systems
RS	Rust language source	
RSM	Compressed Filetype for Mods of Mario Fangames	SMBX2
RSA	Harwell–Boeing matrix format. Used for exchanging and storing sparse matrices.	
RSL, RSLS, RSLF	Resilio Sync File Placeholder	
RST	reStructuredText	Docutils
RTF	Rich Text Format text file (help file script)	many - Microsoft Word
RUA	same as RSA	
RUN	AMPL script file	AMPL
RUN	Makeself shell self-extracting archive	shell

== See also ==
- List of filename extensions
- List of file formats
