= List of personal finance software =

Personal finance software can be used to track spending, create budgets, and plan for future expenses. Some software differs by feature support, software code and development transparency, mobile app features, import methods, Monetization model, privacy and data storage practices.

== Risks ==
The use of expense tracking, budgeting, and other personal finance software carries some risk, most notably is due to the disclosure of a username, password, or other account credentials used to automatically synchronize banking information with an expense tracking application. Another significant area of risk is due to sensitive personal information that is stored anytime data is digitized. This risk may be compounded based on the security the software vendor has implemented as well as the availability of the data and where specifically it is stored (online or a local application). An often overlooked form of risk is due to the monetization model and privacy practices of the vendor or software provider, whether the application is "free" or fee based. Open source software is one way of potentially minimizing the risks of privacy and monetization related risks of data exposure.

The following is a list of personal financial management software. The first section is devoted to free and open-source software, and the second is for proprietary software.

== Free and open-source personal financial management software ==
Name	Written in	Operating system	Mobile Presence	Software license	Description	Countries of origin	Last stable release date	Language
GnuCash	C, Scheme, C++ Java (Android App)	Microsoft Windows, macOS, Linux	Android (limited companion app)	GPL, Apache License 2 (Android App)	Personal and small-business financial-accounting software that supports tracking bank accounts, stocks, income and expenses.		5.17; 27 September 2026	Multilingual
HomeBank	C, GTK	Microsoft Windows, macOS, Linux, OpenBSD, FreeBSD		GPL	Personal accounting software package	Contributors in multiple countries	5.10; 8 March 2026	Multilingual
KMyMoney	C++	Microsoft Windows, macOS, Linux		GPL (v2)	Supports different account types, categorisation of expenses and incomes, reconciliation of bank accounts and import/export to the “QIF” file format	Worldwide	5.2.2; 22 February 2026	Multilingual
Ledger	C++	Any Unix-like including macOS, Microsoft Windows	Android (via Termux)	BSD	A command-line based double-entry bookkeeping application. Data is stored in a plain text file, using a simple format, which the users prepare themselves using other tools. Ledger does not write or modify data, it parses the input data and produces reports.		3.4.1; 26 October 2025	Multilingual

== Proprietary personal financial management vendors and software ==
Name	Spending Tracking	Budgeting	Investment Tracking	Third-Party Bill Paying	Operating Systems	Mobile Support	Software Type	Direct Cost	Other Monetization Models	Description
Banktivity	Yes	Yes	Yes	Yes	macOS	iOS	Standalone	Yearly Fee		Personal finance software for Mac OS.
Mint	Yes	Yes	Yes	No	Any	iOS, Android	Web-Based	Free	Financial product referrals	Deprecated
Moneydance	Yes		Yes		Any (JVM based)		Standalone			
Moneyspire	Manual or Automated	Yes	Yes	No	Windows, macOS, Linux, ChromeOS	iOS, Android	Standalone	Yearly to stay on latest version		Personal finance software for money management and budgeting for Mac, Windows, Linux and Chromebook.
MoneyWiz	Yes	Yes	Yes	No	macOS	iOS	Standalone	Yearly Fee		
Personal Capital	Manual or Automated		Yes	No	Any		Web-Based	Free	Fee-based in-house financial planning. Primarily a wealth management company that provides free services to non-clients.	Offers financial advising for a fee, which establishes a client-fiduciary relationship that they claim makes them less incentivized to sell private client data as they are bound by law to act in their client's best interests.
Quicken	Manual or Automated	Yes	Yes	Yes	Windows, macOS (limited)	Android, iOS	Standalone or Web-Based for full functionality	Yearly fee		
You Need a Budget	Manual or Automated	Yes	Yes	No	Any	Android, iOS, Apple Watch, Alexa	Web-Based	Yearly or Monthly Fee		Differentiates itself by providing budgeting advice.
Origin	Yes	Yes	Yes	Yes	Any	iOS, Android	Web-Based	Yearly or Monthly Fee		Differentiated by being an all-in-one financial platform that includes not only an AI Advisor, but all standard PFM tools plus: Estate planning, tax filing, CFP access, and more.
Bon Credit	Yes	Yes	No	Yes	iOS, Android	iOS, Android	Mobile app	Free	Financial product referral	AI personal finance app that finds more money and helps users manage debt, budgets, and credit.

== See also ==
- Comparison of accounting software
- List of free and open-source software packages
- List of project management software
- List of spreadsheet software
