= KMyMoney =

Accounting software

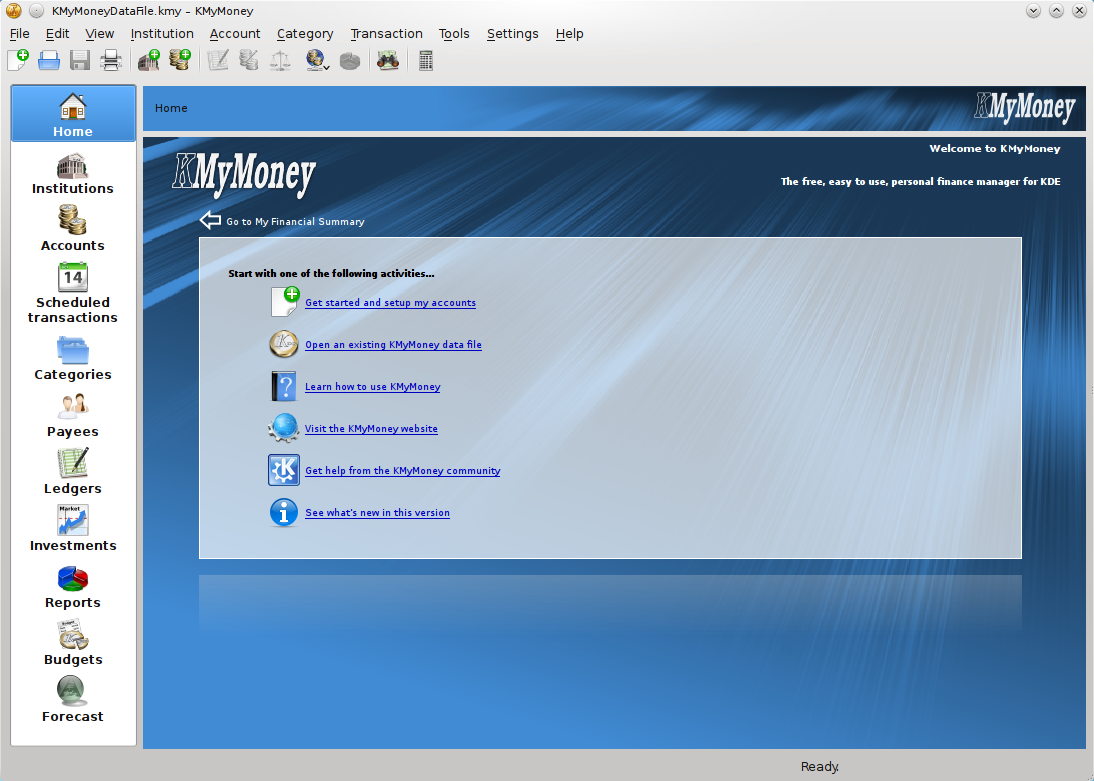
- Screenshot of KMyMoney 4.5.3
- Stable release: 5.2.2 / 22 February 2026
- Written in: C++
- Operating system: FreeBSD, Mac OS X, Linux, Windows
- Type: Accounting
- License: GPL
- Website: kmymoney.org
- Repository: invent.kde.org/office/kmymoney

KMyMoney is a cross-platform double-entry bookkeeping system for personal finance management built on KDE technologies. Its operation is similar to Microsoft Money and Quicken. It supports different account types, categorization of expenses and incomes, reconciliation of bank accounts and import/export to the “QIF” file format. Through plugins, direct download using the OFX and HBCI formats is also possible. CSV imports and exports are also possible via plugins. KMyMoney is free software.

== Features ==
The program is configured to allow views of the data at several levels:

- Accounts - Kmymoney uses the term Account to represent assets and liabilities.
- Institutions - Institutions is an optional field, but if used, data associated with an institution such as a bank, a broker, a credit card can be viewed easily. Use of Institutions also allows a grouping of accounts.
- Payees - The program accumulates a list of payees. Clicking on the "Payee" view, the user can drill down to transactions associated with a specific payee.
- Categories - Categories is a common feature of accounting software. In Kmymoney, Categories and sub-categories are used to classify expense and income entries.
- Sub-categories - Categories and sub-categories allow transactional data to be rolled up into a parent child relationship.
- Tags - Tags allow the user to further delineate transactional data. A tag can be used to group several categories and accounts together as needed.
- Investments - Kmymoney can help track investments.

Other features of the program include check printing via a plugin and several options to retrieve investment prices. Repetitive entries can be scheduled. For example, a paycheck requiring several lines can be set up in the Schedules module.

Released under the GNU General Public License, KMyMoney is free software.

== See also ==
- List of free and open source software packages
- List of personal finance software
