= Moneyspire =

Accounting software application

- Developer: Moneyspire Inc.
- Initial release: 2007; 19 years ago
- Stable release: Moneyspire 2025
- Operating system: Cross-platform (Windows, macOS, Linux, ChromeOS)
- Type: Personal financial management software, Accounting software
- License: Proprietary
- Website: www.moneyspire.com

Moneyspire (formerly Fortora Fresh Finance) is personal finance software and small business accounting software developed by Moneyspire Inc.

The software is available in multiple versions, one for Windows, one for macOS, one for Linux and one for ChromeOS. Moneyspire also has companion mobile apps for iOS and Android.

The software tracks accounts, loans, bills, investments and budgets. Professional looking invoices can also be created and tracked in the Pro edition of Moneyspire. It imports data from QIF, OFX, QFX, QBO and CSV files.

Moneyspire has the ability to use its financial data files interchangeably between the Mac, Windows, Linux and Chromebook versions of the software using a cloud synchronization feature

Moneyspire can also manage accounts from multiple currencies, and automatically track exchange rates and transfers between foreign accounts. Moneyspire also allows downloading of transactions directly from financial institutions via the Moneyspire Connect feature.

Moneyspire is localized in US English, UK English, Spanish, French, Italian, Portuguese, and German.

== See also ==
- Comparison of accounting software
