= Microsoft Money =

Personal finance management software program

- Microsoft Money Plus Sunset Deluxe running in Windows Vista
- Developer: Microsoft
- Release: 7 October 1991; 34 years ago
- Final release: 17.0.150.3817 / 17.0.120.3817 / June 7, 2010
- Operating system: Microsoft Windows
- Type: Personal finance
- License: Proprietary commercial software
- Website: https://web.archive.org/web/20080913000104/http://www.microsoft.com/Money/default.mspx

Microsoft Money is a discontinued personal finance management software program by Microsoft. It has capabilities for viewing bank account balances, creating budgets, and tracking expenses, among other features. Designed for computers using the Microsoft Windows operating system, versions for Windows Mobile were also released. From its inception in 1991 until 2009, Microsoft Money was commercial software; in 2010, Microsoft Money Plus Sunset was released as a free replacement, which allows users to open and edit Money data files but lacks any online features or support.

In 2020, Money in Excel template was launched to Microsoft 365 Family and Personal subscribers; this service was withdrawn in 2023.

== Localization ==
There are localized editions of Microsoft Money for the United Kingdom, France, Japan, Canada, and an International English edition for other English-speaking countries. However, Microsoft has not updated the U.K., French, and international editions since Money 2005. The last Canadian edition was Money 2006.

There are also localized editions for other countries, such as Russia, Brazil, Germany, and Italy. However, these editions were discontinued due to what was believed to be an insufficient user base to justify the expense of localization for more recent editions or the expense to integrate support for national online-banking standards like HBCI in Germany.

Microsoft offered a free downloadable time-limited trial version of Microsoft Money Plus. This trial version imports data files from the Canadian edition of Money, but not from other non-US editions. Users upgrading from other non-US editions can manually export and reimport their accounts and may have to re-enter certain information by hand.

== History ==
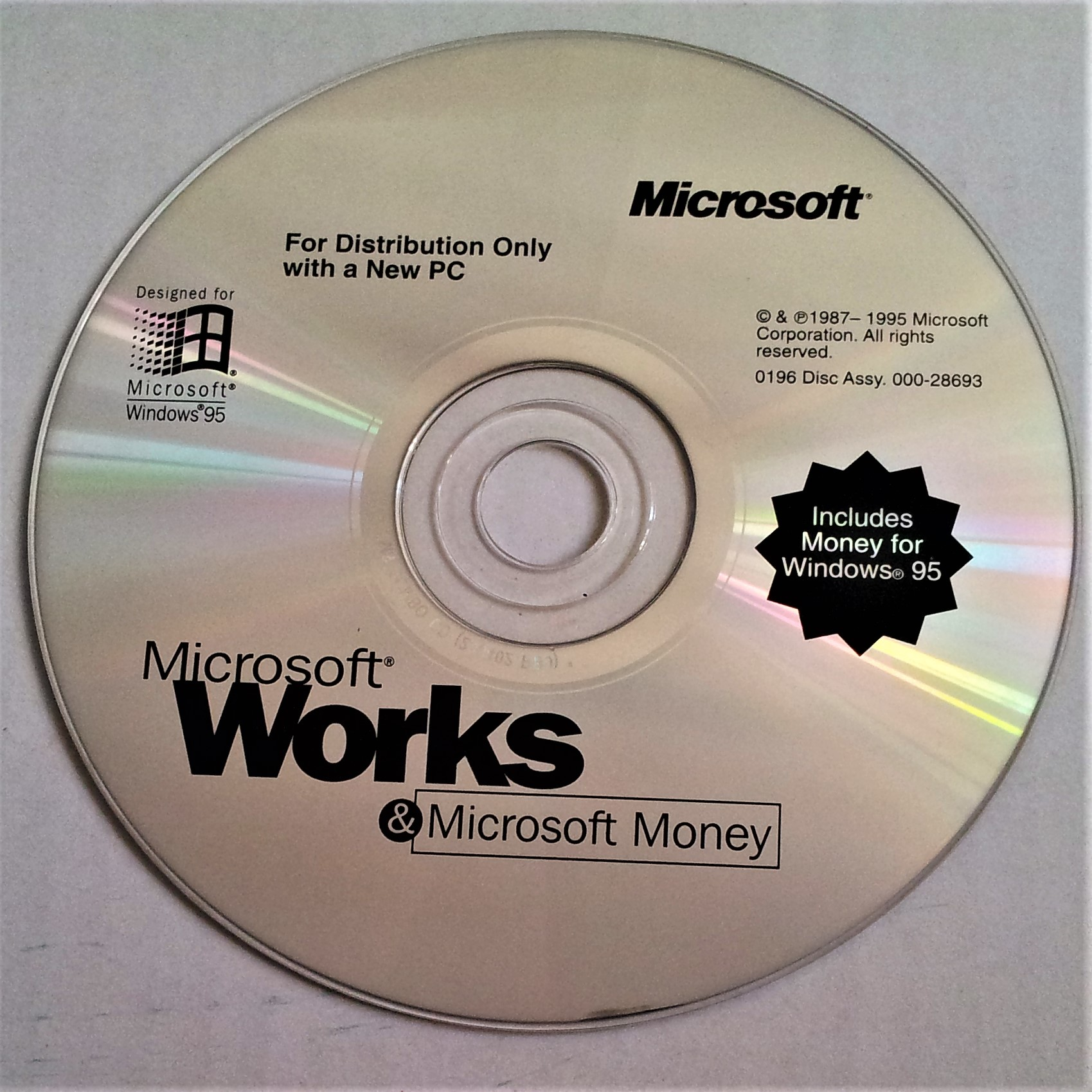
An installation disc of Microsoft Works 4.0 with Microsoft Money 95

The first version of Microsoft Money in 1991 was originally part of the Microsoft Home series. Microsoft developed Money to compete with Quicken, another personal finance management software.

On Windows Mobile, Money 2000–2006 was available on select versions of Windows Mobile, up to, but not including, Windows Mobile 5.0.

Due to Microsoft's propensity to market product versions using the year number rather than the actual version number, the version number reported in the About dialogue box may not actually reflect that of the packaging of the distribution media.

Note that a version 13.x was never created.

=== Discontinuation of Money ===
In August 2008, Microsoft announced that it would stop releasing a new version of Money each year and had no version planned for 2009. The company also announced that it would no longer ship boxed versions of Microsoft Money to retail stores and would instead sell the product only as online downloads.

On June 10, 2009, Microsoft announced that it would stop developing Money, would stop selling it by March 18, 2010, but would continue supporting it until January 31, 2011. The company cited the changing needs of the marketplace as the reason for Money's demise, stating that "demand for a comprehensive personal finance toolset has declined". Product-activation servers used for Money 2007 (and newer versions) were also deactivated after January 31, 2011, preventing these versions from being reinstalled after that date. Microsoft discontinued sales of the software on June 30, 2009, and removed access to online services for existing Money installations in January 2011.

=== Money Plus Sunset ===
On June 17, 2010, Microsoft announced the release of Money Plus Sunset, a downloadable version of Money Plus Deluxe and Money Plus Home & Business. Money Plus Sunset does not require online activation or the installation of any previous version of Money on the user's computer, and it should not be installed over the original 2008 version if online services are still required.

Money Plus Sunset comes with most of the functionality that was available in the retail versions of Money Plus. The features missing are:

- Money Plus Sunset cannot import data files from non-US editions of Money
- Money Plus Sunset is missing all the online services features from earlier versions of Money, e.g.:
  - automatic statement downloads initiated by Money (though users may import downloadable OFX and QIF statements from one's financial institution into the user's Money file)
  - online bill payments
  - online investment quotes (though one can "go to the Portfolio Manager and Update Prices – Update Prices Manually")

A few third-party add-ons have been made to overcome the online limitations of the sunset edition:

- MSMoneyQuotes is a for-pay tool to update quotes. The add-on was written by an ex-Microsoft employee who coded the Portfolio Manager in Money.
- PocketSense is a free tool to download bank account statements (via OFX) and quotes.

=== Money app ===
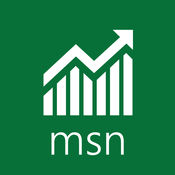
MSN Money app icon

In 2012, a new but unrelated Money was released as a Windows Store app (originally as MSN Money) but as a news aggregator for personal finance, investing, and real estate, as well as stock tracking across the world markets.

=== Money in Excel ===
Money in Excel is a Microsoft premium template for Excel available from 2020 to 2023 for Microsoft 365 Family and Personal subscribers in the US only. In May 2022, Microsoft announced that support for Money in Excel would end effective June 30, 2023.

== Version history ==
Marketed version	Release date	Actual version	Notes
Microsoft Money	October 2, 1991	1.0	Initial release for Windows 3.0.
Microsoft Money 2.0	September 9, 1992	2.0	
Microsoft Money 3.0	January 6, 1994	3.0	Final Win16 version.
Microsoft Money 95	August 24, 1995	4.0, 4.0a	First Win32 version. To celebrate Windows 95's release and to promote the advantages of a native Windows 95 application, Money 95 was available as a free web download from Microsoft's website between August 24, 1995, and October 31, 1995. Users also had the option of paying US$9.95 plus tax (for US residents) or CA$14.95 plus tax (for Canadian residents) for CD-ROM or 3.5" floppy disk media along with a hard copy user's manual during that promotional period. This was requested either through a promotional mail-in card (distributed in stores) or by calling Microsoft directly. The free download (moneyweb.exe) version is the same as the paid 3.5" floppy disk version but without a user's manual. The CD-ROM version includes a Multimedia Catalog (an electronic catalog of Microsoft products available at that time) and an online user's manual. Users who took advantage of this version did not receive the retail box, but the contents are the same as the retail version. This version also supports Windows NT 3.51. Version 4.0a corrects file import bugs.
Microsoft Money 97	November 19, 1996	5.0	Adds ability to close accounts, provides online banking capabilities including online stock quotes (supported until February, 2004), and contains minor UI improvements. Last version to support Windows NT 3.51.
Microsoft Money 98	October 30, 1997	6.0	First version to require Internet Explorer as part of the interface.
Microsoft Money 99	August 14, 1998	7.0	Last localized release for Germany and Brazil.
Microsoft Money 2000	July 30, 1999	8.0	First edition for Windows Mobile platforms. Last localized release for Italy and in German for Switzerland and Austria.
Microsoft Money 2001	September 7, 2000	9.0	
Microsoft Money 2002	August 16, 2001	10.0	Last version to support Windows 95 and Windows NT 4.0 SP5.
Microsoft Money 2003	October 24, 2002	11.0	
Microsoft Money 2004	August 29, 2003	12.0	Last version to support Windows 98 First Edition.
Microsoft Money 2005	October 21, 2004	14.0	Last localized release for the U.K., France, and the International edition.
Microsoft Money 2006	September 27, 2005	15.0	Last localized release for Canada. Last version for Windows 98 SE/ME, and Windows 2000 SP3. Also the last version for Windows Mobile platforms.
Microsoft Money 2007	August 19, 2006	16.0	First version to require product activation for copies installed from downloaded installation files.
Microsoft Money Plus	December 6, 2007	17.0.150.1415 (Home & Business) 17.0.120.1415 (Deluxe) 17.0.80.1415 (Essentials)	Final retail release. First and only version to require product activation on those copies installed from CD. Microsoft subsequently released Money Plus Sunset (see the following row), an edition of Money Plus that does not require activation.
Microsoft Money Plus Sunset	March 18, 2010	17.0.150.3817 (Home & Business) 17.0.120.3817 (Deluxe)	See Money Plus Sunset above.
Windows 8 edition	August 1, 2012	18.0 (Launched with Windows 8)	Microsoft has since created a portal entry in MSN, called Money.
Windows 10 edition			Was shipped with Windows 10 devices.
