= Quarter-to-date =

Quarter-to-date (QTD) is a period starting at the beginning of the current quarter and ending at the current date. Quarter-to-date is used in many contexts, mainly for recording results of an activity in the time between a date (exclusive, since this day may not yet be “complete”) and the beginning of either the calendar or fiscal quarter.

In the context of finance, QTD is often provided in financial statements detailing the performance of a business entity. Providing current QTD results, as well as QTD results for one or more past quarters as of the same date, allows owners, managers, investors, and other stakeholders to compare the company's current performance to that of past periods.

QTD describes the return so far this quarter. For example, the quarter to date (quarter) return for the stock is 8%. This means from the beginning of the current quarter until the current date, the stock has appreciated by 8%.

Comparing QTD measures can be misleading if not much of the quarter has occurred, or the date is not clear. QTD measures are more sensitive to early changes than late changes.

Example: QTD outgoing shipments for March 3
 
  January shipments-----   800,000 lbs
  February shipments---   750,000 lbs
  March shipments-------    50,000 lbs
                         _________
                               
  QTD shipments          1,600,000 lbs

== See also ==
- Year-to-date (YTD)
- Month-to-date (MTD)
- Year-ending
- Moving annual total (MAT)
