= HomeBank =

Free software for managing personal accounting

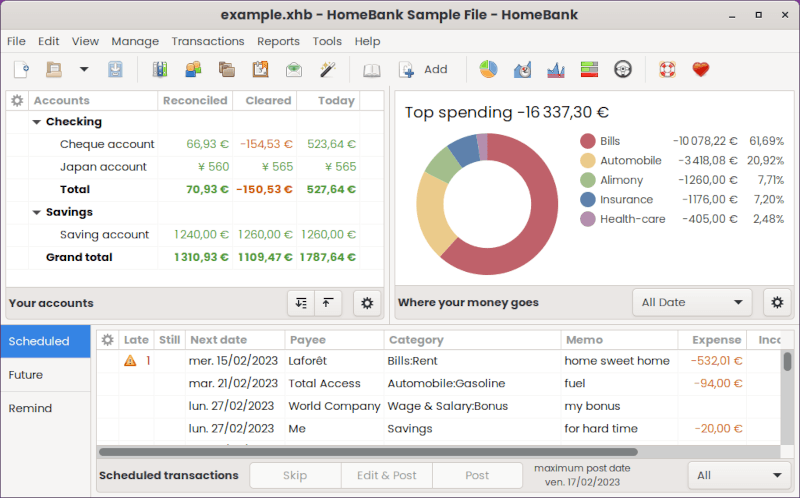
- HomeBank main window
- Developer: Maxime Doyen
- Initial release: 1995; 30 years ago
- Stable release: 5.9.4 / 10 July 2025
- Repository: https://code.launchpad.net/~mdoyen/homebank/5.9.x
- Written in: C, GTK
- Engine: GTK
- Operating system: Linux, Windows, macOS
- Available in: 56 languages
- List of languages multilingual
- Type: Accounting software
- License: GPL-2.0-or-later
- Website: https://www.gethomebank.org

HomeBank is a personal accounting software package that runs on BSD Unix, Linux, Windows, macOS (via MacPorts or Homebrew) and AmigaOS.

Released under version 2 or later of the GNU General Public License, HomeBank is free software alternative to popular commercial personal banking offerings. HomeBank can be found in the software repositories of Linux distributions such as Fedora, Ubuntu and Linux Mint. HomeBank is now available as a Flatpak for Linux.

Unlike the more complicated alternatives to HomeBank, you don't have to learn double-entry bookkeeping to use HomeBank.

== History ==
Development of HomeBank began in 1995 on Amiga. Stable version 1.0 was released in January 1998 as shareware. In May 2003, version 3.0 was released as free software and a full rewrite was started using the C language and the Gtk+ library. Version 3.2 was released in September 2006 on Linux. As of August 2007, HomeBank was made available on macOS. In May 2008, version 3.8 was also released on Microsoft Windows.

== Features summary ==
- Import and export of QIF & CSV files. Import OFX files.
- Transfers between: bank, cash, goods, credit card & debts filtered by date, amount, type, etc.
- Breakdown of transactions: distribute a transaction over several expense categories.
- Generation of general reports, pie charts, line charts, vehicle costs, etc.

== See also ==
- Accounting software
- List of personal finance software
