= Moneydance =

Personal financial software application

- Developers: The Infinite Kind, formerly Reilly Technologies
- Initial release: 1997
- Stable release: 2022.2 (build 4060) / October 12, 2021
- Written in: Java
- Operating system: Cross-platform (Linux, Mac OS, OS/2, Unix and Windows)
- Available in: English, Spanish, French, German and others
- Type: Accounting
- License: Proprietary
- Website: infinitekind.com/moneydance

Moneydance is a personal finance software application developed by The Infinite Kind, formerly developed by Reilly Technologies, USA. Written in Java, it can be run on many different computers and operating systems. Under the hood, Moneydance implements a double-entry bookkeeping system, but the user interface is geared towards non-accountants.

Moneydance implements the OFX protocol to perform online banking and bill payment. Other features include check printing, graphing and reporting, scheduled transaction reminders, transaction tags, VAT/GST tracking, budget management and tracking, file encryption, and investment portfolio management.

Moneydance has been localized into French, German, UK English, Norwegian, Greek (partially), Spanish, Portuguese and Italian. UK supermarket Tesco's "Personal Finance" software is based on Moneydance.

An open application programming interface (API) is also available, allowing people to write extensions to the program.

The application is scriptable in jython.

== See also ==
- List of personal finance software
