= Month-to-date =

Business term

Month-to-date (MTD) is a period starting at the beginning of the current calendar month and ending on either the current date or the last business day before the current date. Month-to-date is used in many contexts, mainly for recording results of an activity in the time between a date (exclusive, since this day may not yet be "complete") and the beginning of the current month.

In the context of finance, MTD is often provided in financial statements detailing the performance of a business entity. Providing current MTD results, as well as MTD results for one or more past months as of the same date, allows owners, managers, investors, and other stakeholders to compare the company's current performance to that of past periods.

MTD describes the return so far this month. For example: the month to date return for the stock is 8%. This means from the beginning of the current month until the current date, the stock has appreciated by 8%.

Comparing MTD measures can be misleading if not much of the month has occurred, or the date is not clear. MTD measures are more sensitive to early changes than late changes.

== See also ==
- Year-to-date (YTD)
- Quarter-to-date (QTD)
- Year-ending
- Moving annual total (MAT)
