= YTD =

YTD may refer to:

- Year-to-date, the period from the beginning of the current year up to the present day
- Thicket Portage Airport, Canada, IATA code YTD
