= Financial Navigator =

American software company

Financial Navigator, Inc
- Type: Private
- Industry: Computer software
- Founded: 1983 in Mountain View, California
- Fate: Acquired by Asset Vantage in 2017
- Headquarters: Mountain View, California
- Key people: Ed Van Deman (founder, CEO); John Van Deman (founder)
- Products: Accounting software
- Number of employees: <100
- Website: www.finnav.com

Financial Navigator, Inc was a United States-based software company that developed accounting software targeting single family offices (SFO), multi-family offices (MFO), accounting firms, and high-net-worth individuals. The company was founded in 1983 and headquartered in Mountain View, California. The final version release of its primary application, Navigation was released in 2011.

Financial Navigator was based in Santa Clara, California in 2017, when it was acquired by Asset Vantage.

== History ==
Financial Navigator, Inc was founded in 1983 by brothers Ed and John Van Deman to service the accounting and financial reporting needs of the high-net-worth market, where very few comprehensive software packages existed at the time.

In 2017, Financial Navigator's CEO was Ed Van Deman.

Financial Navigator was acquired by Asset Vantage in April 2017. Asset Vantage Inc., based in Santa Clara, California, also provided cloud-based financial software with a focus on family offices. Asset Vantage was owned by UniDEL group.

== Products ==
The company's primary product was Navigator, a financial management and reporting application for managing complex financial situations (such as those faced by the very wealthy, trust and estate managers, and CPAs, among others). Navigator is complemented by a suite of modules that extend the functionality of the main application, adding features such as consolidated reporting, performance measurement, brokerage and banking downloads, as well as check printing, among other features.

=== Navigator ===
The core application provided functionality such as investment and portfolio tracking (of everything from securities, to oil and gas, to antiques), financial statements, and financial reporting. The application used a double-entry accounting system. The application supported the .OFX (Open Financial Exchange) file format standard. It ran on Windows workstations and servers and could be deployed locally or as a hosted solution.

The first version was released in 1984 and upgrades followed roughly every two years. The final version was 9.5, released in October 2011. Modules that extended the functionality of the program were added over the years, such as the ability to link to bank and brokerage accounts as well as automatic updating of security prices.

=== Modules ===
- ROI - ROI adds performance reporting for investments and portfolios that allows for risk adjusted benchmarking. ROI can measure performance by manager or individual investor.
- Advanced Reports - Module that allows for the creation of reports that span multiple years and entities.
- Portfolio View - Module that allows for automatically classifying portfolios by geography, capitalization, sector, industry and other criteria.
- BrokerLink - Retrieves and imports brokerage data in to Navigator from online brokerage accounts.
- BankLink - Retrieves and imports bank transaction from checking, savings, credit card, and bill payment services in to Financial Naviagtor. Supports .OFX, .QFX, and .QIF file formats.
- CheckForm - Print checks, including MICR codes, on to blank check stock.
- StockWeb - Updates current stock prices and dividends over the internet and conduct research over the web.
- PriceLink - Module that can retrieve and update historical prices in a portfolio including bonds, warrants, and mutual funds.
- Navigator OneView - Was a hosted, managed service that provides data collection, portfolio tracking, and financial reporting to clients.
