= Niko Resources =

Canadian oil and gas company

- Type: Public
- Traded as: TSX: NKO
- Industry: Petroleum
- Founded: 1987
- Headquarters: Calgary, Alberta, Canada
- Key people: Ed Sampson (Chair, Pres., CEO); Will Hornaday (COO, Dir); J. Cummings (Dir); W. DeBoni (Dir)
- Products: Oil, Natural Gas
- Revenue: US$194.464 mil Ytd June 2011 ▼14.4%
- Net income: ▼US$(54.334) mil Ytd June 2011 (1h10: $78.23M)
- Total assets: $1,830.11 mil June 2011▼7.3% qoq
- Total equity: $1,127.47 mil June 2011▲2.9% qoq
- Number of employees: 213 (2011)
- Divisions: Niko Resources Cyprus Ltd; Niko Resources Bangladesh Ltd; Niko Resources Cayman Ltd; Niko Resources Trinidad & Tobago; Voyager Energy
- Website: nikoresources.com

Niko Resources is an India- and South East Asia-focused oil and gas exploration and production company that shares ownership of many exploration and development properties with Komodo Energy and Reliance Industries. It holds exploration rights to 37,000,000 acres (150,000 km^{2}) of land in 7 countries. As of 2011, production only takes place in India and Bangladesh. Major acquisitions include a $310 million purchase of Black Gold Energy on the 18th of November, 2009. This expanded Niko Resources' presence in Indonesian oceanic exploration. The following year, Niko Resources acquired Voyager Energy for $37.6 million, which expanded its presence in Trinidad.

Most of the company's revenue comes from India (85.92% in fiscal year 2011 up from 81.6% in 2010/87.53% in 1Hlf10), revenue from India rose 106% in the 12 months ended March 2011 compared to only 3.9% for Bangladesh.

The company is investing heavily in Trinidad. In June 2011, it paid $78.1 million for offshore block 5c and is initiating exploration of another block (block 2AB). Though 58% of Niko's net exploration land position is in Indonesia (16.7M acres or 10X more than India) exploration expenditure in India has increased from 1.4X higher than Indonesia in 2010 to 2.6X higher ($50M vs $19M), and is forecast to increase to 12X higher in 2012 due to drilling the D4 and D6 blocks. In terms of gross land holdings about a quarter of all land is in India (35,187 km^{2}) Between 2001 and 2006 the market value of the company grew elevenfold.

== History ==
Niko Resources started out as an oil and gas company operating mainly in and around the Western Canadian Basin (Alberta and Saskatchewan); it wasn't until 1993 that the company showed interest in operating abroad. Its first venture into India involved the Hazira gas field (located SW of Surat) which was awarded to it and the Gujarat State Petroleum Corporation by the government of India on September 23, 1994. First production abroad began July 1995 at Hazira. The Hazira acquisition was the first in a string of large investments in India made by Niko; between 1994 and 2006 all major company moves were made in India.

In 2002 a natural gas exploration discovery it took part in (partnered with Reliance Industries) turned out to be India's biggest and one of the world's largest for that year (the discovery was made in the Krishna-Godavari basin).

In 2003, it expanded operations outside of India, beginning with Bangladesh. In 2008 started operations in Pakistan (March, awarded four blocks), Madagascar (October, Grand Prix Block), Indonesia (November, awarded 4 blocks). Then in 2009 it purchased a 26% interest in a block in Trinidad, the block is held by a consortium of companies each with interests in it ranging from 29.25% (Centrica) to 35% (Petrotrin). When it acquired Voyager Energy, operations in Trinidad were expanded (Voyager held four blocks in the country including a 9.75% stake in the 2AB block, Niko's first (and only) interest in the region).

In 2013, a panel of the International Centre for Settlement of Investment Disputes held that it had jurisdiction to hear two claims by Niko Resources (Bangladesh) Ltd. against entities owned by the Government of Bangladesh relating to two 2005 gas well blowouts in Bangladesh and to contracts for the delivery of natural gas. In the same year, Niko Resources exited Pakistan.

In March 2019, Niko Resources was delisted from the Toronto Stock Exchange.

== Operations ==
Exploration capital expenditure in the first half of 2010 ($96 million) was spent mostly in India (34.4%), Indonesia (28.1%) and Madagascar (22.9%). In India ownership of all major properties is shared with Reliance Industries. The Cauvery block & NS (North Surat, NELP 2) block are 100% owned by Niko. As of March 2011 total 2P reserves are about 200 million barrels of oil equivalent (1.2 trillion MMcfe) 64% of which is natural gas; that represents a 24% overall decline since 2010 (proved reserves saw the biggest decline down 29%). 98.6% of proved reserves is natural gas. Less than 2% of production/revenue comes from Canadian and Bangladeshi condensate. Currently (June 2011) only 2 of the 7 countries Niko has major operations in contribute revenue; The other five countries hold 41.8% of total assets by value. Though expansion outside of India is significant the country remains the most important source of cash flow and production with revenue per Mcfe of oil/gas production nearly twice that of Bangladesh. Production and earnings are forecast to fall significantly in 2012 due to lower gas production at India's D6, D4 and 9 blocks and new terminal maintenance costs from the D6 block.

INDIA Hazira: It is a matured gas field. The field complies with latest international safety standards like ISO & OHSAS. The field has recently completed cumulative 3 million safe working hours without LTI. The 50 km^{2} block (onshore and offshore) is 33% owned by Niko and contributes approximately 3% of total revenue (as of June 2011). D6 block in India (10% interest, production began in September 2008) - Although a major natural gas producer the company has recently been negatively affected by 5 year fixed price contracts. The D6 block was the largest natural gas discovery in company history, currently it also includes a gas processing plant (the block also includes the MA oil fields). Mining licenses expire in 2028. Contributed 85% of revenue in the quarter ended June 2011. Natural gas produced is purchased under long-term contracts and sold on the spot market. D4 Block (15% interest, controlled by Reliance Industries 85%) - located in the Orissa Basin it covers over 4,000,000 acres (16,000 km^{2}) of offshore land. Reserves at D4 are estimated to be double those at D6. NEC25 (10% interest, 90% by Reliance Industries) - covers over 3,000,000 acres (12,000 km^{2}) offshore in the Bay of Bengal.

TRINIDAD Trinidad (Trinidad and Tobago is the largest exporter of Liquid Natural Gas to the USA) - five of the nine oil fields Niko owns interest in are controlling interests up from just two (Guayaguayare shallow (65%) and deep horizon (80%)) in 2009. In June 2011 Niko acquired a 25% interest in oil block 5C (covers 325 km^{2}) from Canadian company Sonde for $75.5 million cash making Trinidad a core area for the company. In Trinidad exploration licenses are issued as production sharing contracts (PSC's).

KURDISTAN Kurdistan - Niko has few interests in the Kurdistan region of northern Iraq. Mid 2010, drilling activities were going on & potential test is yet to be done.

MADAGASCAR Madagascar - Few interests in Morondava basin.

=== Production ===
Averaged over the 2011 fiscal year (ended March 31) production was 294,765 Mcf (49,127 boe)/d due entirely to new production from the D6 block (oil increased 97% to 2784 bbls/d (9.4% of total), gas increased 22.3% to 278,060 Mcf (46,343 boe)/d (94.3% of total). In the first half of 2010 daily production averaged about 50,751 boe/d (93.9% natural gas, based on conversion ratio of 6000 cubic feet:1 boe) up 61.67% when compared to the first half of 2009 (31,393 boe/d, 96.1% natural gas). Contribution from the D6 block in India is largely the reason for the higher numbers (the D6 block also helped revenue because of higher realized prices there).

== Criticism ==
Between 2003 and 2006 Niko was involved in a corruption scandal involving the acquisition of the $750 million Tengratila and Feni gas fields in Bangladesh. Additionally, the company accidentally caused an explosion and initially refused to pay for damages, although eventually did compensate the 620 affected families. During this time, they gave the minister responsible for overseeing compensation claims a Luxury SUV. Investigation into corruption allegations were made by the Royal Canadian Mounted Police in January 2009. Niko hired consultancy firm Stratum Developments Ltd which distributed bribes among Bangladesh government officials.

== See also ==
- SeaSeep
