= Empower (financial services) =

American financial services company

Empower Annuity Insurance Company of America

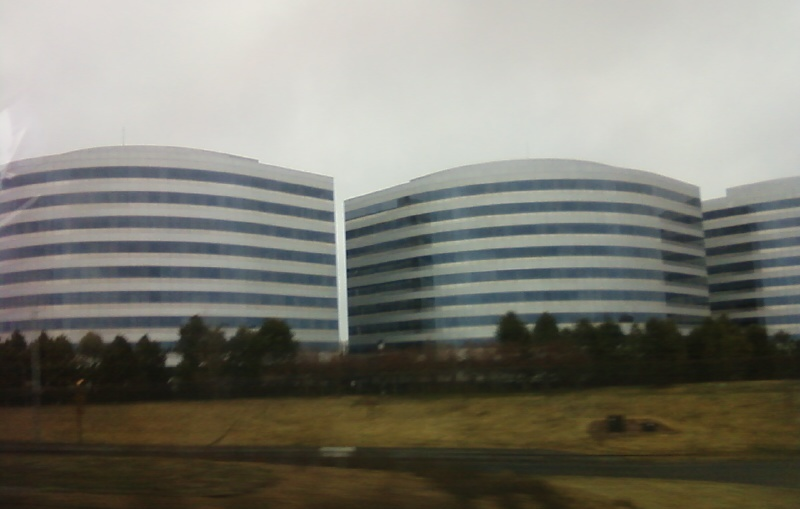
- Headquarters of Empower
- Type: Subsidiary
- ISIN: CA39138C1068
- Industry: Financial services
- Founded: 1891; 135 years ago
- Founder: Jeffry Hall Brock
- Headquarters: Greenwood Village, Colorado, U.S.
- Number of locations: ~40 (as of December 2020)
- Area served: Worldwide
- Key people: Edmund F. Murphy III (CEO)
- Products: Investment banking Finance; Finance and insurance Asset management Wealth management Investment management Brokerage services Mutual funds Insurance; Risk management Investment advisory Annuities; Employee benefits Equities trading Financial advisory Retirement planning Financial literacy Underwriting
- Services: Financial services
- Revenue: US$60.6 bil Ytd Dec'2020 ▲65.9%
- Net income: US$3.1 bil Ytd Dec'2020▲64.8%
- AUM: US$1.0 trillion Ytd Dec'2020
- Total assets: US$1.0 trillion Ytd Dec'2020
- Members: ~12.0 million individuals over 67,000 Organization (2020)
- Number of employees: ~245,800(~197,000 advisor relationships Employees, 40,000 advisor Employee ~8,800 Core Employees and thousands of distribution partners Employees) (2020)
- Parent: Great-West Lifeco
- Subsidiaries: Personal Capital
- Rating: Fitch: AA (2020); Moody's: Aa3 (2020); S&P: AA (2020); AM Best: A+ (2020)
- Website: empower.com

Empower Annuity Insurance Company of America is a retirement plan recordkeeping financial holding company based in Greenwood Village, Colorado, United States. It is the second-largest retirement plan provider in the United States.

== History ==
Empower was created in 1891, when parent company Great-West Lifeco was founded as an insurance provider on the Canadian prairie. The modern iteration of Empower was launched in 2014, when the retirement businesses of Great-West Life combined the record-keeping services of Great-West Financial, JPMorgan Chase, and Putnam Investments. Part of Great-West Life & Annuity Insurance Company, Empower is an indirect wholly owned subsidiary of Great-West Lifeco. As of 2019, Empower is led by President and CEO Edmund F. Murphy III.

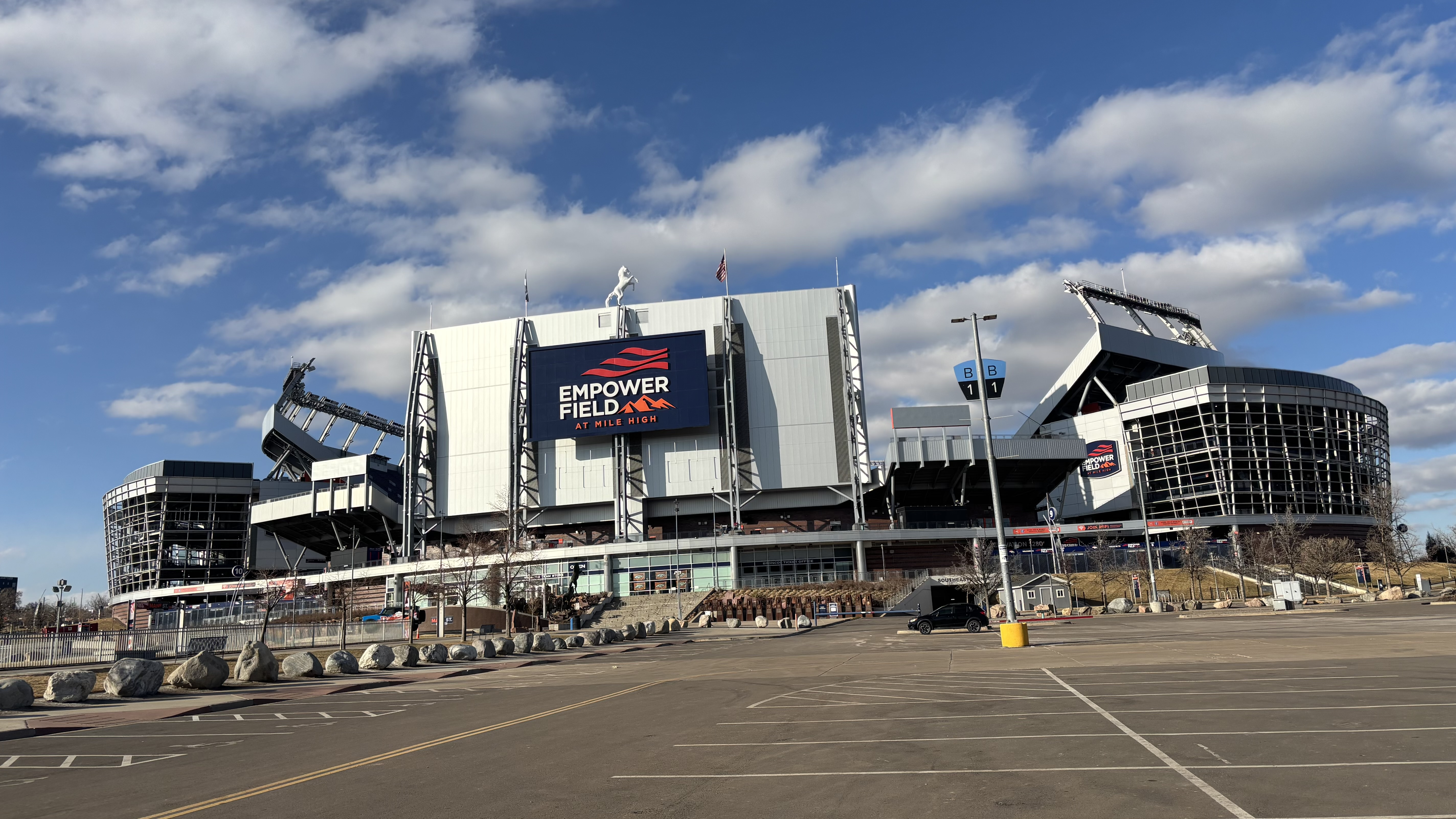
Empower Field at Mile High in Denver, Colorado, the home stadium of the NFL’s Denver Broncos, pictured in February 2025

In 2019, Empower signed a 21-season contract to the naming rights of the Denver Broncos stadium, which is named Empower Field at Mile High.

In June 2020, the company announced its acquisition of Personal Capital, an investment and wealth management adviser, for $825 million. As of June 2020, Empower has administered more than $1 trillion in assets for 12 million individuals in over 67,000 organizations. In September 2020, the company acquired the retirement plan business of MassMutual for $4.4 billion. On September 29, 2020, Empower announced that it would acquire the retirement plan recordkeeping business of Fifth Third Bank.

Empower acquired the heritage SunTrust 401(k) recordkeeping business, which includes approximately 300 retirement plans consisting of more than 73,000 plan participants and $5 billion in plan assets in January 2021.

In February 2022, the company rebranded from "Empower Retirement" to "Empower". Empower acquired Prudential Financial's full service retirement in April 2022 .

== Companies ==
- Personal Capital
