= MTD =

MTD may refer to:

== Legal ==
- Motion to dismiss

== Medicine ==
- Maximum tolerated dose, in drug development
- Muscle tension dysphonia, hyperfunctional musculature causing a hoarse voice

== Organizations ==
- Makkal Tamil Desam Katchi (People's Tamil Land Party), a political party in Tamil Nadu, India
- Maritime Trades Department, AFL–CIO
- Metal Trades Department of the AFL-CIO
- Michael Tobias Design, a manufacturer of electric bass guitars
- Movimiento de Trabajadores Desempleados, a type of unemployed worker's organization in Argentina
- MTD Products, an American manufacturer of outdoor power equipment for the mass market
- Champaign–Urbana Mass Transit District, a regional public transportation operator in Champaign County, Illinois, United States
- MTD, a German developer and manufacturer of line, bar and hyperspectral LED luminaires for industry
- Mettler Toledo (NYSE stock symbol MTD)

== Technology ==
- Memory technology device, a type of device file in Linux for interacting with flash memory
- Metadynamics, a computer simulation method in computational physics, chemistry and biology
- MTD (mobile network), a former manual mobile network in Sweden, Norway and Denmark

== Other uses ==
- Making Tax Digital a UK Government initiative of HMRC
- Month-To-Date, a time period used in business and accounting
- Moralistic therapeutic deism
- MTD(f), a minimax search algorithm
