= Home Bank =

Home Bank may refer to:

- The Home Bank of Canada, founded 1903 and failed 1923.
- Home Bank, formerly CFF Bank, a subsidiary of Home Capital Group.
- HomeBank, a free and open-source personal accounting software package.
