= Meniga =

UK-based fintech

- Company type: Software
- Industry: Financial software
- Founded: 2009; 17 years ago in Reykjavík, Iceland
- Founders: Georg Ludviksson; Asgeir Asgeirsson; Viggo Asgeirsson
- Headquarters: London, UK
- Key people: Dheeraj (Raj) Soni (CEO); Piotr Tybura (CTO); Kristofer Einarsson (CDSO)
- Number of employees: 70+
- Website: meniga.com

Meniga is a financial software company founded in Reykjavík, Iceland in 2009 by Georg Ludviksson and brothers Asgeir Asgeirsson and Viggo Asgeirsson. It provides digital banking products. Meniga has offices in London, Reykjavík, and Warsaw.

In June 2023, Dheeraj (Raj) Soni was appointed as the company's CEO.

== Products ==
Meniga specialises in helping large, established banks make customer experiences more personalised. Its API products use consolidated and enriched transaction data for consumer analytics. Meniga's products also include an Icelandic B2C personal financial management app that enables users to connect multiple financial accounts.

== Clients ==
Meniga works with many large banks and financial institutions globally, including Unicredit, Groupe BPCE, UOB, and Crédito Agrícola.
