= YNAB =

American financial technology company

- Initial release: 2004; 21 years ago
- Type: Personal finance software
- Website: ynab.com

You Need a Budget (YNAB) (pronounced /ˈwaɪnæb/) is an online personal budgeting program based on the envelope system developed by a privately owned American company of the same name. It is available via any web browser or a mobile app.

== History ==
The program was initially developed as standalone software in 2004 by Jesse Mecham, while he was in college pursuing his master's degree in accounting, after he and his wife faced financial difficulty and decided to improve their budgeting. It evolved from a spreadsheet that he created for the budgeting process. The acronym stands for "you need a budget." In 2015 they changed their licensing model to software as a service. In 2020, YNAB had 115 employees, all working remotely.

== Overview ==
The service encourages users to follow four principles or "rules":

1. Give every dollar a job: Each dollar in a budget is allocated to a specific purpose. This concept is also called zero-based budgeting.
2. Embrace true expenses: All expenses are planned for, so that there are no surprises.
3. Roll with the punches: Being flexible when there is overspending.
4. Age your money: Keeping money in your budget without immediately spending it.

Users can either import transactions automatically from their financial institutions or input them manually. The software also displays financial reports to keep users informed about their finances at a glance.

== Awards and recognition ==
YNAB has been named one of the best budgeting apps by U.S. News & World Report, Kiplinger's Personal Finance, CNN, HuffPost, CNBC, and hundreds of other financial reporting outlets.

- The Wall Street Journal – Best budgeting app for hands-on budgeters.
- Forbes – Best Budgeting Apps
- Money – Best budgeting app for college students.
- Lifehacker – Most popular personal finance software.
- Wirecutter – "Great pick for hard-core budgeters".
- Investopedia – Best overall budgeting app.

== See also ==
- List of personal finance software
- Software as a service
- Web application
