= Personal financial management =

Managing ones own personal finances

Personal financial management refers to "ways" or "methods" of managing ones own personal finances. It is also known by its acronym, PFM, which refers to the type of software used for personal finance apps. Simply put, PFM refers to software that helps users manage their money. PFM often lets users categorize transactions and add accounts from multiple institutions into a single view. PFM also typically includes data visualizations such as spending trends, budgets and net worth.

== History ==
PFM started in 1983 with the founding of Intuit. Scott Cook and Tom Proulx, the company’s founders, witnessed the rise of the personal computer and saw an opportunity to develop personal financial software. Their flagship product, Quicken, became a standard for many households and was eventually followed by QuickBooks, which helped small businesses manage their finances.

Around the same time, a similar competing product introduced by MECA Software, conceived by MECA President Gerald Rubin, and designed by author Andrew Tobias called Managing-Your-Money (MYM) came out, first running on the Apple-II, and later the IBM-PC. Later in 1990 Microsoft released their own PFM platform called Microsoft Money.

Microsoft worked with Intuit and CheckFree in 1997 to create Open Financial Exchange (OFX), which allowed financial institutions to exchange data with web users, paving the way for online PFM software. Yodlee was founded in 1999. Originally a site that let users view email, banking, news, travel, and shopping in one place, it soon pivoted to focusing exclusively on banking, allowing users to view their financial accounts from different institutions all at once.

A wave of online PFM tools launched around 2006, with Wesabe and Mint at the forefront. Mint was acquired by Intuit in 2009 for $170 million, and Wesabe went under in 2010. Wesabe’s CEO cited the fact that Mint automatically aggregated accounts and transactions as a key reason that Wesabe lost market share to Mint. Since 2008, PFM has expanded in scope. Financial advisory companies such as LearnVest, Personal Capital and Credit Karma integrate PFM into their software.

Other companies providing personal financial management platform products for banks and fintech companies include Meniga, Moneythor, MX, Strands, Coinscrap Finance and Tink.

== See also ==
- Financial literacy curriculum
