= RootsMagic =

Genealogy software program

- Original author: Bruce Buzbee
- Developers: RootsMagic, Inc. (formerly: FormalSoft Inc)
- Release: February 4, 2003; 23 years ago
- Stable release: 12.1.2 / October 26, 2026; 11 days ago
- Operating system: Windows, Mac OS
- Size: 110.17 MB (Windows); 161.45 MB (MacOS)
- Type: Genealogy software
- License: Proprietary
- Website: www.rootsmagic.com

RootsMagic is a genealogy software program designed and written by RootsMagic, Inc, an American software design and development company founded by Bruce Buzbee in 1987. Bruce originally wrote the program Family Origins, with the initial release of RootsMagic occurring on February 4, 2003.

== Features ==
RootsMagic genealogy program assists family historians in tracking, organizing, printing, and sharing family history.

- The software was originally developed as a Microsoft Windows-only application, but is now available in Mac OS.
- It is designed as a single-file database with the ability to open multiple databases at once.
- It can import or export data from/to websites Ancestry.com and/or FamilySearch.org, as well as database files from various application formats.
- It allows backups to hard drives, flash drives, Dropboxs and more.
- It has seven different views providing multiple methods of navigating records:
  - Pedigree view with either five or six user selectable generations visible;
  - Family view for viewing and editing an entire single family unit on one screen with parents shown as primary, including grandparents and children;
  - Tree view allows graphical viewing of ancestors in various branch relationships (added in version 12);
  - Descendants view with between two to seven user selectable generations branching below the primary person selected;
  - People list view displaying a customizable table of selected facts for multiple people contained in the database;
  - Couples list view similar to the People list but displaying a list of paired couples in database, with marriage date and place;
  - Associates view displaying a list people with various types of associations set by the user
- "Drag and drop" feature allows copying individual records, families, and entire extended families from one database file to another.
- May be used to create user website files, and maintains its own free website (hosted at MyRootsMagic.com) for customers to publish their own genealogies.
- There are three downloadable versions of RootsMagic UK Version 12 sold in the United Kingdom; Basic (£29.95), Standard (£39.95) and Platinum (£49.95) with slightly higher pricing for USB delivery. An Upgrade version is also available (£19.95) for previously registered users. U.S. version 12 sold by RootsMagic, Inc costs $39.95 for new users and $29.95 for registered users of previous versions. The version known as RootsMagic Essentials is a free download offered as a no time limit, no subscription sample package for new users to try before making a purchase of the full software version.

== Major release history ==
Version	Released
v.1.0	February 4, 2003
v.2.0	May 24, 2004
v.3.0	September 8, 2005
v.4.0	March 25, 2009
v.5.0	November 28, 2011
v.6.0	November 19, 2012
v.7.0	November 25, 2014
v.8.0	September 30, 2021
v.9.0	February 27, 2023
v.10.0	June 19, 2024
v.11.0	September 5, 2025
v.12.0	October 8, 2026

== File format ==
RootsMagic 4 through 12 databases use SQLite 3 as its database engine. So, the .rmgc and .rmtree database files created are readable using third party SQLite management and development tools. Subsequently, the .rmgc file extension is used for RootsMagic versions 1 through 7 database files while the .rmtree file extension is used for versions 8 and above.

== Platforms ==
RootsMagic was designed to operate on the Windows and Mac OS platforms, however some users successfully operate RootsMagic on Linux machines using Wine.

With the RootsMagic 10 release, the application operated on Windows 8, 10, and 11, as well as MacOS 10.13 (High Sierra) through 14 (Sonoma). Version 11 operates on Windows 10 or 11, as well as MacOS 12 (Monterey) through 26 (Tahoe). Version 12 operates on Windows 10 or 11, as well as MacOS 12 (Monterey), 13 (Ventura), 14 (Sonoma), 15 (Sequoia), 26 (Tahoe), or 27 (Golden Gate)
