= MoneyWiz =

Money management application

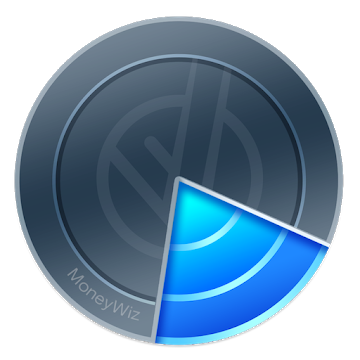
- MoneyWiz 3 Icon
- Original author: Iliya Yordanov
- Developer: SILVERWIZ LLC
- Stable release: MoneyWiz 2021 / January 1, 2021; 5 years ago
- Operating system: macOS, iOS
- Available in: English, Chinese, Russian, Portuguese, Spanish, Japanese, Korean, Italian, French, Polish, German, Swedish, Czech, Romanian, Indonesian, Ukrainian, Hungarian, Catalan, Dutch, Turkish, Bulgarian.
- Website: https://wiz.money

MoneyWiz is a money management application that runs on Apple platforms, including iOS and macOS. MoneyWiz was developed by SilverWiz, and is a personal finance app from the United States. MoneyWiz has been named the Best Finance App out of the Top 500 Must Have Apps by The Telegraph.

MoneyWiz tracks income and expenses, and allows users to set and track budgets. It has the ability to schedule payments and can also create reports based on the information inputted by the user. The application also has its own syncing platform, referred to as "SYNCbits", which syncs a user's information to any device in which the app is installed. MoneyWiz supports twenty languages and is said to comply with the financial system in the countries where the official language is one of the supported ones.

== Online Banking (bank sync) ==
MoneyWiz connects to over 40,000 banks in over 50 countries around the world, via four data providers, to download and categorize new transactions automatically.

== See also ==
- List of personal finance software
