= SeaSeep =

SeaSeep is a combination of 2D seismic data (a group of seismic lines acquired individually, as opposed to multiple closely space lines), high resolution multibeam sonar which is an evolutionary advanced form of side-scan sonar, navigated piston coring (one of the more common sea floor sampling methods), heat flow sampling (which serve a critical purpose in oil exploration and production) and possibly gravity and magnetic data (refer to Dick Gibson's Primer on Gravity and Magnetics).

The term SeaSeep originally belonged to Black Gold Energy LLC and refers to a dataset that combines all of the available data into one integrated package that can be used in hydrocarbon exploration. With the acquisition of Black Gold Energy LLC by Niko Resources Ltd. in December 2009 the term now belongs to Niko Resources.

The concept of a SeaSeep dataset is the modern day offshore derivative of how many oil fields were found in the late 19th and early 20th century; by finding a large anticline structure with an associated oil seep. In the United States, many of the first commercial fields in California were found using this method including the Newhall Field discovered in 1876 and the Kern River Field discovered in 1899. Seeps have also been used to find offshore fields including the Cantarell Field in Mexico in 1976; the largest oil field in Mexico and one of the largest in the world. The field is named after a fisherman, Rudesindo Cantarell, who complained to PEMEX about his fishing nets being stained by oil seeps in the Bay of Campeche.

The biological and geochemical manifestations of seepage leads to distinct bathymetrical features including positive relief mounds, pinnacles, mud volcanoes and negative relief pockmarks. These features can be detected by multibeam sonar and then sampled by navigated piston coring. Spec and proprietary multibeam seep mapping and core geochemistry by Texas A&M University's Geochemical & Environmental Research Group and later TDI Brooks demonstrated thermogenic charge in deepwater Angola and deepwater Nigeria leading to an aggressive exploration program by a number of oil companies and subsequent discoveries. The emphasis on, and marketplace acceptance of, multibeam mapping combined with navigated coring as an improvement over grid-based approaches to geochemical exploration is attributed to AOA Geophysics Inc.
