= Year-ending =

Year-ending (or "12-months-ending") is a 12-month period used for financial and other seasonal reporting.

In the context of finance, "Year-ending" is often provided in monthly financial statements detailing the performance of a business entity. Providing current "Year-ending" results, as well as "Year-Ending" results for one or more past years as of the same date, allows owners, managers, investors, and other stakeholders to compare the company's current performance to past periods and annual figures.

== Related terms ==
In contrast to Year-To-Date, the Year-Ending summaries give a better understanding performance by including the seasonal performance. For example, a sales figure for "Year Ending July 2006" would include the holiday sales from December 2005, while extrapolating from a July Year-To-Date sales figure would underestimate annual sales.

In contrast to Year-on-Year or Year Over Year figures, which compare similar periods during other years, (for example December 2004 to December 2005), Year-ending is less volatile and are directly comparable to annual figures.
