= Personal Capital =

American financial services company

- Type: Subsidiary
- Industry: Finance
- Founders: Bill Harris, Rob Foregger, Louie Gasparini, Paul Bergholm
- Headquarters: Redwood Shores, CA
- Area served: United States
- Key people: Jay Shah (President)
- AUM: $21.9 billion
- Number of employees: 1,193
- Parent: Empower Retirement
- Website: www.personalcapital.com

Personal Capital is an online financial advisor and personal wealth management company headquartered in Redwood Shores, CA with offices in San Francisco, CA, Denver, CO, Dallas, TX and Atlanta, GA.

== History ==
Personal Capital was founded by Bill Harris, Rob Foregger, Louie Gasparini and Paul Bergholm in 2009. Personal Capital was formerly known as SafeCorp Financial Corp. The name was changed in 2010 and publicly launched on September 9, 2011. Since 2012, Personal Capital has been registered with the U.S. Securities and Exchange Commission (SEC) as an investment advisor.

In June 2016, National Basketball Players Association (NBPA) teamed up with Personal Capital through a financial education program.

In December 2016, Personal Capital raised $25 million in Series E funding from IGM Financial, closing the round at $75 million.

In July 2020, Canadian-owned, Denver-based Empower Retirement announced it would be purchasing Personal Capital for $825 million plus a contingency payout.

In February 2023, Empower Retirement officially renamed Personal Capital and all of its products to Empower.

== Product ==
Since inception, Personal Capital has provided both free and paid wealth management products.

Free registration has included a digital overview of user finances along with access to Personal Capital's financial analytic and planning tools. Users link their banks, brokers, 401(k)s, mortgages, credit cards, and loans. Analytics and planning advice is then automated through a 401(k) fee analyzer, retirement planner, mutual fund analyzer, an investment checkup, and cash flow tool. A free Personal Capital app for iOS and Android devices has also been available to all users with the same monitoring, analytic, and planning functionalities as the web version.

Managed accounts have been an available option for clients with a minimum of $100,000 in assets and include a team of financial advisors assigned to each account in exchange for a fee.

== Security ==
Personal Capital partners with Yodlee Interactive to store and secure customer brokerage credentials.
