= Quicken Interchange Format =

File format for financial data

- Filename extension: .qif
- Developed by: Intuit

Quicken Interchange Format (QIF) is an open specification for reading and writing financial data to media (i.e. files).

== Background ==
Although still widely used, QIF is a format older than Open Financial Exchange (OFX). The inability to reconcile imported transactions against the current account information is one of the primary shortcomings of QIF. Most personal money management software, such as Microsoft Money, GnuCash and Quicken's low end products (e.g. Quicken Personal and Quicken Personal Plus), can read QIF files to import information. Intuit's Quicken used to be able to import QIF, too, but with its 2006 version it dropped that support for several important account types, including checking, savings, and credit card accounts. The Australian version of Quicken still allows the importing of QIF files for these account types. However, unlike the American version, it is not possible to export data to QIF or any other file type for any account type. The QIF format does not allow a user to mark the currency in which a transaction was completed. In some cases this may cause problems for users who do use multiple currencies when they export or import into another software package.

Quicken's proposed replacement for the QIF format has been the proprietary Quicken Web Connect (QFX) format. It is commonly supported by financial institutions to supply downloadable information to account holders, especially by banks that support integration of Money or Quicken with their online banking. Not everybody, however, was, or is, happy with this replacement. Some banks dislike it because Quicken (Intuit) charges licensing fees to use QFX. Other banks pass the fees on by charging customers for downloading QFX files. Because Microsoft Money imports either QIF or OFX format files, and Microsoft does not charge banks any licensing fees to use OFX for Money, banks do not normally charge for downloading QIF and OFX files. (QIF and OFX are open formats, free for anyone to use.)

== Data format ==
A QIF file typically has the following structure:

!Type:[type identifier string]
[single character line code]Literal String Data
...
^
[single character line code]Literal String Data
...
^

Each record ends with a ^ (caret). All the data in the file is stored in ASCII strings, and the file could be edited in any text editor.

simple example

!Type:Bank
D03/03/10
T-379.00
PCITY OF SPRINGFIELD
^
D03/04/10
T-20.28
PYOUR LOCAL SUPERMARKET
^
D03/03/10
T-421.35
PSPRINGFIELD WATER UTILITY
^
...etc.

=== Header line ===
The first line in the file must be a header line, to identify the type of data contained. Valid values for accounts are:

Code	Description
!Type:Cash	Cash Flow: Cash Account
!Type:Bank	Cash Flow: Checking & Savings Account
!Type:CCard	Cash Flow: Credit Card Account
!Type:Invst	Investing: Investment Account
!Type:Oth A	Property & Debt: Asset
!Type:Oth L	Property & Debt: Liability
!Type:Invoice	Invoice (Quicken for Business only)

There are also values for QIF files of internal Quicken information:

Code	Description
!Account; NAccount Name; TAccount Type; DAccount Description	Account list or which account follows
!Type:Cat; NCategory Name; DCategory description	Category list
!Type:Class	Class list
!Type:Memorized	Memorized transaction list

A header line is not followed by a separator line; it is immediately followed by the first field of a detail item.

=== Detail items ===
The Detail section consists of several Detail Items, each on a separate line. Each line begins with a single character identifying code in the first column, followed by the literal data for that field. The detail item is terminated by a separator line. The fields can be in any order (except that within split transactions, the category, amount, and memo must be adjacent). If a single transaction block contains several detail items with same code, the last row is used for import.

Standard detail item

Code	Description	Used In	Example
D	Date. Leading zeroes on month and day can be skipped. Year can be either 4 digits or 2 digits or '6 (=2006).	All	D25 December 2006
T	Amount of the item. For payments, a leading minus sign is required. For deposits, either no sign or a leading plus sign is accepted. Do not include currency symbols ($, £, ¥, etc.). Comma separators between thousands are allowed. For investment transactions, this amount is always a positive number, even for Buy and CvrShrt transactions.	All	T-1,234.50
U	Seems identical to T field (amount of item.) Both T and U are present in QIF files exported from Quicken 2015.	All	U-1,234.50
M	Memo—any text you want to record about the item.	All	Mgasoline for my car
C	Cleared status. Values are blank (unreconciled/not cleared), "*" or "c" (cleared) and "X" or "R" (reconciled).	All	CR
N	Number of the check. Can also be "Deposit", "Transfer", "Print", "ATM", "EFT".	Banking, Splits	N1001
P	Payee. Or a description for deposits, transfers, etc.	Banking, Investment	PStandard Oil, Inc.
A	Address of Payee. Up to 5 address lines are allowed. A 6th address line is a message that prints on the check. 1st line is normally the same as the Payee line—the name of the Payee.	Banking, Splits	A101 Main St.
L	Category or Transfer and (optionally) Class. The literal values are those defined in the Quicken Category list. SubCategories can be indicated by a colon (":") followed by the subcategory literal. If the Quicken file uses Classes, this can be indicated by a slash ("/") followed by the class literal. For Investments, MiscIncX or MiscExpX actions, Category/class or transfer/class. (40 characters maximum)	Banking, Splits	LFuel:car
F	Flag this transaction as a reimbursable business expense.	Banking	F???
S	Split category. Same format as L (Categorization) field. (40 characters maximum)	Splits	Sgas from Esso
E	Split memo—any text to go with this split item.	Splits	Ework trips
$	Amount for this split of the item. Same format as T field.	Splits	$1,000.50
%	Percent. Optional—used if splits are done by percentage.	Splits	%50
N	Investment Action (Buy, Sell, etc.).	Investment	NBuy
Y	Security name.	Investment	YIDS Federal Income
I	Price.	Investment	I5.125
Q	Quantity of shares (or split ratio, if Action is StkSplit). For investment transactions, this amount is always a positive number, even for Sell and ShtSell transactions.	Investment	Q4,896.201
O	Commission cost (generally found in stock trades)	Investment	O14.95
$	Amount transferred, if cash is moved between accounts	Investment	$25,000.00
B	Budgeted amount - may be repeated many times for monthly budgets.	Categories	B85.00
X	Extended data for Quicken Business. Followed by a second character subcode (see below) followed by content data.	Invoices	XI3
XA	Ship-to address	Invoices	XAATTN: Receiving
XI	Invoice transaction type: 1 for invoice, 3 for payment	Invoices	XI1
XE	Invoice due date	Invoices	XE6/17' 2
XC	Tax account	Invoices	XC[*Sales Tax*]
XR	Tax rate	Invoices	XR7.70
XT	Tax amount	Invoices	XT15.40
XS	Line item description	Invoices	XSRed shoes
XN	Line item category name	Invoices	XNSHOES
X#	Line item quantity	Invoices	X#1
X$	Line item price per unit (multiply by X# for line item amount)	Invoices	X$150.00
XF	Line item taxable flag	Invoices	XFT

Investment Actions

Investment Action	Description
Buy	Buy a security with cash in the account
BuyX	Buy a security with cash transferred from another account
Cash	
ContribX	Cash transferred into an account from another account. (The other side of WithdrwX.)
WithdrwX	Cash transferred out of an account into another account. (The other side of ContribX.)
ExercisX	Exercise stock options with cash transferred from another account
Exercise	Exercise stock options
Expire	Expiration of stock options
Grant	Grant of stock options
Vest	Vesting of stock options
Sell	Sell a security with proceeds received in the account
SellX	Sell a security and transfer the proceeds to another account
ShtSell	Sell a security in a short sale transaction and deposit sale proceeds in the account
CvrShrt	Buy back a security sold short to close the position with cash in the account
CGLong	Long-term capital gains distribution received in the account
CGLongX	Long-term capital gains distribution transferred to another account
CGMid	Medium-term capital gains distribution received in the account
CGMidX	Medium-term capital gains distribution transferred to another account
CGShort	Short-term capital gains distribution received in the account
CGShortX	Short-term capital gains transferred to another account
Div	Dividend received in the account
DivX	Dividend transferred to another account
IntInc	Interest Income received in the account
IntIncX	Interest Income transferred to another account
ReinvDiv	Dividend reinvested in additional shares of the security
ReinvInt	Interest Income reinvested in additional shares of the security
ReinvLg	Long-term capital gains reinvested in additional shares of the security
ReinvMd	Medium-term capital gains reinvested in additional shares of the security
ReinvSh	Short-term capital gains reinvested in additional shares of the security
Reprice	Reprice employee stock options
XIn	Cash transferred into the account
XOut	Cash transferred out of the account
MiscExp	Miscellaneous expense
MiscExpX	Miscellaneous expense covered by another account
MiscInc	Miscellaneous income, optionally associated with a security
MiscIncX	Miscellaneous income, optionally associated with a security, transferred to another account
MargInt	Interest paid on a margin loan received in the account
MargIntX	Interest paid on a margin loan transferred from another account
RtrnCap	Return of capital received in the account
RtrnCapX	Return of capital transferred to another account
StkSplit	Change in the number of shares as a result of a stock split.
ShrsOut	Removal of shares from an account
ShrsIn	Addition of shares into an account

Notes

- The S, E, $, and % fields are repeated for each split of this transaction.
- For investment action codes that end in X, the Category field indicates the other account used to transfer cash from or to.
- If the line immediately following an XS record does not begin with ^ or X, that is considered a continuation of the XS record.

All the fields in detail items are optional—if not included, that field will be left blank in the imported transaction. Also, Quicken seems to do little error checking on these items; if the same field is included twice in the detail item, the second one will just overwrite the first one.

=== Record end ===
The separator line signals the end of the current transaction. The last detail item in the file should end with a separator line.

Code	Description
^	A single caret in the first column, and the rest of the line blank.

== Export workarounds for QuickBooks: exporting to QIF ==
QuickBooks doesn't allow exporting to QIF. Only the Intuit Interchange Format (IIF) is supported. An IIF to QIF converter will not solve the problem either, as journal entries can't be exported in IIF format, only lists are exportable. A viable way to overcome this problem is to set up a journal report, to show all journal entries. Print the report using the "print to file" option. Set the file type to Excel before printing. Rename the extension of the resulting file from PRN to CSV. Use this XL2QIF Excel macro to convert to QIF. The Excel file may need to be reorganized to generate the appropriate format for the macro to work, such as separating cheque accounts from term deposits, etc. The above referenced Excel macro supports split transactions.

See references for further examples of reporting to excel

== Import workarounds for Quicken 2005+: importing from QIF ==
While Intuit officially only supports QIF importing on asset, liability, cash, small business payable, and invoice accounts, Quicken will still allow you to import transactions using QIF into any account type. Two methods are explained below:

=== Indirect (Temporary cash account) method ===
Note: If you really need to get data from a QIF file into an account that does not support QIF imports (e.g. Quicken 2005 and later), you can import from the QIF file into a (temporary) Cash account. Make sure the first line in the QIF file says "!Type:Cash" for importing it into a Quicken Cash account. (QIF files can be edited in any text editor.) After importing the transactions, you can copy/paste them into a register of your choice. Tested in 2006 version. Note that you cannot copy cash transactions into brokerage accounts in Quicken 2007.

=== Direct method ===
To import transactions into brokerage accounts (or any account), a little text editing is necessary. Ensure to prefix your transaction data by copying-and-pasting the top four lines from the example below - the example is for an investment transaction:

!Account
NJoint Brokerage Account
TInvst
^
!Type:Invst
D12/21' 7
NBuy
YIBM
T11010.00
I110.10
Q100
MPurchase of 100 shares of IBM stock on 21 December 2007 at $110.10 per share
^

Line 2 (N) in the example must contain the exact name of the account you are intending to import into. If you use an account name that does not exist, Quicken will ask if you want to create a new account (This functionality has been test in Quicken 2012). When importing the file, the account you choose in the QIF-import-dialog box is irrelevant (you can even choose "all accounts") - once you begin the import process, the application will prompt to confirm importing to the intended account. In order to be successfully read by Quicken the text file must be saved in ANSI format. Files saved in UTF-8 format will not be correctly processed.

The example above was tested in Quicken 2007, Quicken 2008, Quicken 2010, Quicken 2012, Quicken 2015 and an equivalently formatted text file using "TCCard" instead of "TInvst" under Quicken 2011.

If the transactions are being imported into an existing account, make sure to reconcile the account in the old data file before creating the QIF export file. Before accepting an import, validate any 'Match' transactions and change to 'New' where there isn't really a match. Quicken can match on amounts even when the dates are significantly different.

When editing the QIF file, check for any transaction Category (the field starting with 'L') for an account name contained in brackets, such as [Checking Account]. The brackets reference another quicken account, and if left in place will post a transaction in that account in addition to the account being imported to, with potentially troublesome results. Avoid this by removing the text including the brackets and replacing with another category if desired. The only exception to this is an opening balance transaction, identified by 'Opening Balance' in the 'P' field (POpening Balance). In this case, the brackets need to be left in place, and the account name between the brackets must exactly match the account name in the 'N' field.

The above two paragraphs are based on exporting and importing in Quicken 2010.

== Sample Account Export ==
An account with the following five transactions shown in the screenshot below was exported to a qif file. The content of that file is shown immediately beneath with commentary to the right of the transactions to better pair them against the table generated from an Account Transactions report of the sample account.

QIF File Content

!Type:Bank                       --------------------------------------------------------------
D2/10'2020
T0.00
CX                                    ACCOUNT DETAILS
POpening Balance
L[TestExport]
^                                --------------------------------------------------------------
D2/14'2020
T67.50
PT-Mobile
LBills:Cell Phone                     T-Mobile Transaction
SBills:Cell Phone                        (+/- split)
Esign up credit                          (memos for splits, no overall memo)
$-15.00
SBills:Cell Phone
Enew account
$82.50
^                                --------------------------------------------------------------
D2/14'2020
Mmoney back for damaged parcel
T32.00                                US Post Office Transaction
PUS Post Office                          (credit)
LMiscellaneous                           (overall memo)
^                                --------------------------------------------------------------
D2/12'2020
Mtwo transactions, equal
T-10.00
PTarget                               Target Transaction
LFood:Groceries
SFood:Groceries
E50%
$-5.00
SFood:Groceries
E50% 2
$-5.00
^                                --------------------------------------------------------------
D2/11'2020
CX
Mnon split transaction                Walmart Transaction
T-25.00                                  (non-split/single)
N123                                     (cleared status reconciled)
PWalmart                                 (includes check number)
LFood:Groceries
^                                --------------------------------------------------------------
D2/10'2020
C*
Mtest order 1
T-100.00
PAmazon.com                           Amazon Transaction
LFood:Groceries                          (split)
SFood:Groceries                          (cleared status clear)
E50%
$-50.00
STransportation:Automobile
E25%
$-25.00
SPersonal Care:Haircare
E10%
$-10.00
SHealthcare:Prescriptions
E15%
$-15.00
^                                --------------------------------------------------------------
