= QFX (file format) =

- Filename extension: .qfx
- Developed by: Intuit
- Container for: Financial information
- Extended from: Open Financial Exchange

QFX is Intuit's proprietary version of the standard OFX financial interchange file format. QFX is used in Intuit's "Web Connect" and "Direct Connect" features to transmit and receive financial information over the internet.

A QFX file is a standard OFX file with additional fields to support a licensing fee paid by institutions to Intuit. In contrast, the standard OFX format is a free and open standard. Intuit's Quicken software will only import QFX files where the providing institution has paid the fee and in some cases passed quality tests, otherwise giving the error message "Quicken is currently unable to verify the financial institution information for this download". The same error message is given for Quicken users attempting to import previously downloaded QFX files with a Quicken subscription that has expired. Quicken 2017 was the last version sold with a three-year expiration.

== See also ==
- Open Financial Exchange
