= Quicken =

Personal finance management tool

- Developer: Quicken Inc.
- Release: 1983; 43 years ago
- Stable release: Quicken 2022
- Operating system: MS-DOS, Apple II, Windows, Classic Mac OS, macOS, iOS, Android
- Available in: English
- Type: Personal financial management software
- License: Proprietary
- Website: www.quicken.com

Quicken is a personal finance management application originally developed and offered by Intuit. Intuit sold Quicken to H.I.G. Capital in 2016, and H.I.G. sold Quicken to Aquiline Capital Partners in 2021.

Quicken runs on Windows and Mac systems, though the data is incompatible between the two versions. Earlier versions ran on MS-DOS and the Apple II. Versions of Quicken range from "starter" editions to more advanced offerings. Since 1998, each version has tended to have the release year in the product name (e.g., Quicken Basic 2008); before then, versions were numbered (e.g., Quicken 8 for DOS). Quicken is available for purchase and use only in Canada and the United States, and only in English.

== Product description ==
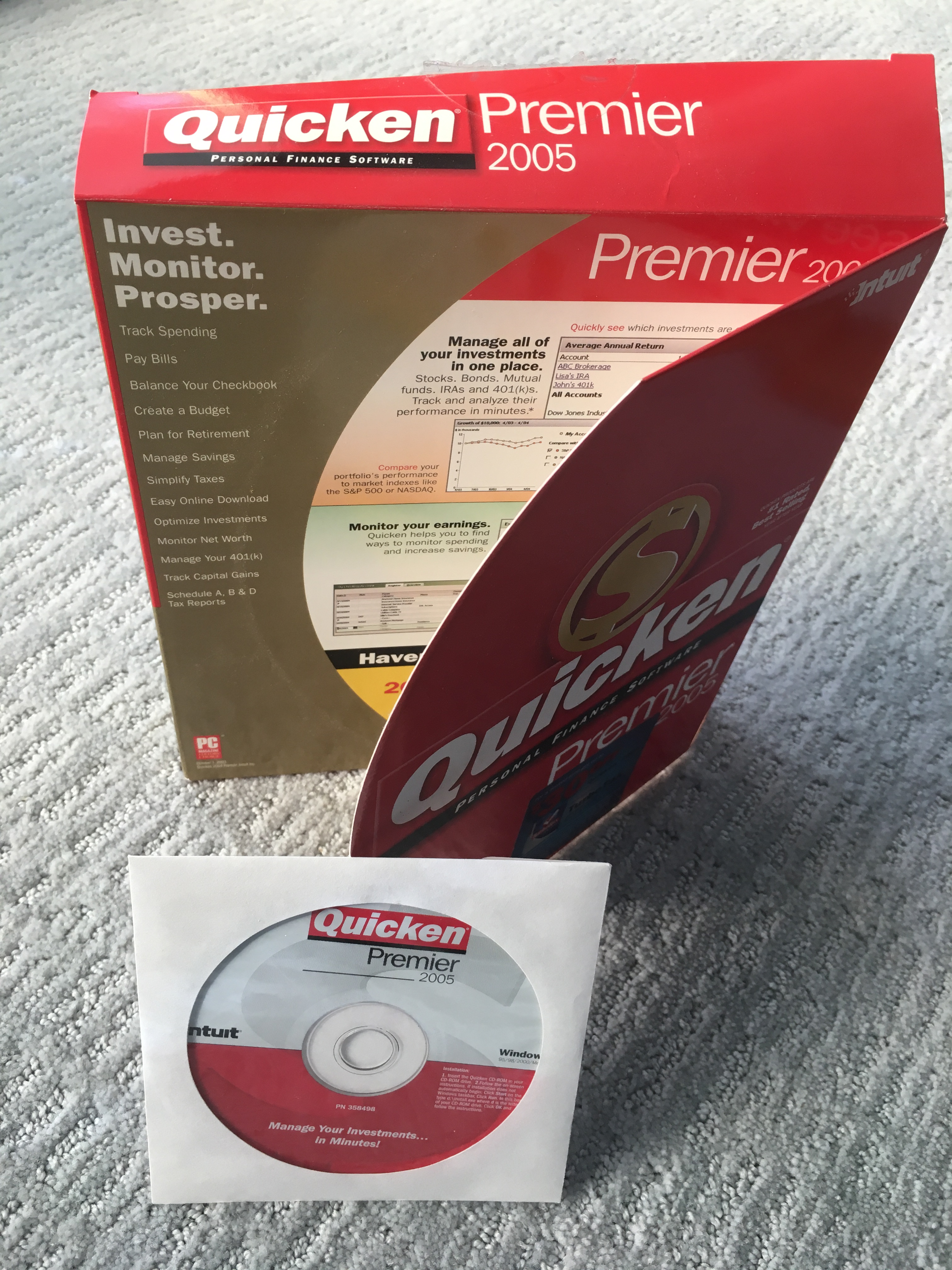
Quicken Premier 2005 box and installation CD

The Quicken name typically refers to the core product offering of personal financial management software. The software includes financial planning activities that, historically, people may have done on paper – recording banking transactions, planning a budget and measuring progress against it, tracking investments and their prices and performance. Quicken has offered various editions, with varying prices – such as Basic which includes only those typical activities for someone with simple banking accounts, to Small Business for someone who also runs a business out of their home.

Quicken includes online services that allow users to retrieve transactions from various providers – such as their bank or credit card company. In most cases, online services and technical support are now supported for up to three years after the product's labeled version. e.g. Quicken 2018 will be supported until 2021.

== Related products ==
The Quicken brand had extended to other personal and household areas, including healthcare, but these extra applications are now defunct.

Quicken Health Expense Tracker was a free online tool for healthcare consumers enrolled in participating health plans. Users could "manage and direct their health care finances, view and organize medical expenses, payments and service histories, and download and organize personal health claims data." The Quicken Medical Expense Manager was a desktop software tool for managing healthcare paperwork, tracking claims and payments, and consolidating related information.

Quicken Kids & Money was a Web-based program that aimed to help parents teach five- to eight-year-old children how to earn, spend, save, and share money.

The only remaining extended product is Quicken Home & Business, which is aimed at smaller/less complex businesses than would use QuickBooks. Quicken Home & Business encompasses management of rental properties, and is only available on the Windows platform.

== Software as a service ==
Quicken Online was a free, hosted solution (see software as a service) by Intuit. Intuit hosted all of the user's data, provided patches and regularly upgraded the software automatically. Initially, this was launched as a monthly paid subscription, and was a free service for over a year.

Intuit completed the acquisition of competitor Mint.com on November 2, 2009. Quicken Online was discontinued on August 29, 2010, and users were encouraged to transition to Mint.com. When Intuit sold Quicken to H.I.G. Capital, Mint.com remained with Intuit rather than being part of Quicken.

Quicken introduced a cloud-based service, Simplifi, in 2020.

Beginning with Quicken 2018, the Quicken desktop software became a subscription service, with support provided with the subscription. Annual memberships can be purchased directly from Quicken.com. Quicken no longer associates the year with the release, the name is merely e.g. "Quicken Deluxe".

== Editions ==
The following are current (selling and supported) and retired (discontinued in both sales and support) versions of Quicken.

=== Current ===
- Quicken Classic Starter, Deluxe, and Premier for Windows or Mac; support is for the duration of the subscription
- Quicken Classic Business & Personal for Windows or Mac; support is for the duration of the subscription
- Quicken Simplifi

=== Retired ===
Quicken 8 for DOS

(Dates retired are shown.)

- Starter, Deluxe, Premier, Home & Business, Rental Property Manager 2017 - April 30, 2020
- Starter, Deluxe, Premier, Home & Business, Rental Property Manager 2016 - April 30, 2019
- Starter, Deluxe, Premier, Home & Business, Rental Property Manager 2015 - April 30, 2018
- Starter, Deluxe, Premier, Home & Business, Rental Property Manager 2014 - April 30, 2017
- Starter, Deluxe, Premier, Home & Business, Rental Property Manager 2013 - April 30, 2016
- Starter, Deluxe, Premier, Home & Business, Rental Property Manager 2012 - April 30, 2015
- Starter, Deluxe, Premier, Home & Business Edition 2011 - April 30, 2014
- Starter, Deluxe, Premier, Home & Business, Rental Property Manager 2010 - April 30, 2013
- Starter, Deluxe, Premier, Home & Business 2009 - April 30, 2012
- Basic, Deluxe, Premier, Home & Business 2008 - April 27, 2011
- Basic, Deluxe, Premier, Home & Business 2007 - April 30, 2010
- 2006 (Win) – April 30, 2009
- 2005 (Win) – April 30, 2008
- 2004 – April 30, 2007
- 2003 – April 25, 2006
- 2002 – April 19, 2005
- 2001 – April 19, 2005
- 2000 – May 18, 2004
- 98 and 99 – April 20, 2004
- Version 6 for Windows. "Designed for Windows 95. Release 6.0. (c) 1996"
- Version 3 for Windows 3.1
- Quicken Essentials for Mac - April 30, 2015
- Quicken for Mac 2007 - retired October 2016
- Quicken Mac 2007 OS X Lion compatible - retired October 2016
- Quicken for Mac 2006
- Quicken for Mac 2005 - retired April 30, 2015

== Problems ==
Intuit stopped supporting its Quicken software in the United Kingdom in 2005, leaving many thousands of users with only partly functional software.

In 2008 and 2009, Quicken users reported an unusually large number of software bugs for a commercial product. A review of Quicken 2010 suggests that quality and user interface in that product year is dramatically improved.

As of July 15, 2010, existing Quicken Online users' data is not transferable/importable into Mint.com. This is in direct contrast to VP Aaron Patzer's promise, made on April 27, 2010: "[Until the merger with Mint.com is complete], you can continue to use Quicken Online just like you have. Once we have completed integrating all features to Mint, you will be able to easily transfer your information and data to ensure the smoothest transition possible."

== History of Quicken on Mac ==
Quicken was originally written for MS-DOS and the Apple II back in 1983 and first released in 1984. The substantial differences between the Mac and these two platforms meant the later Macintosh version was written from the ground up. This led to incompatibilities between the file formats for the earlier versions and the Macintosh version. Quicken for Mac 1.0 was released in 1988.

When Mac OS X came out in 1999 (server) and 2001 (desktop), a new platform emerged. Apple provided backward compatibility with the classic Mac OS in Mac OS X, so Quicken for Mac development continued in an older platform database structure (PowerPC-based). After they switched the Mac from PowerPC to Intel processors, Apple continued to support PowerPC-based apps (via Rosetta) on their Intel-based Macs until Mac OS X Lion.

In 2012, Quicken for Mac 2007 on Intel was released. Intuit decided to start from scratch and Quicken Essentials for Mac (QEM) was created in 2010. Quicken 2015 for Mac, released in August 2014, and later versions for Mac are built on the Quicken Essentials for Mac foundation. These newer versions of Quicken for Mac use an SQLite database.

== Reception ==
InfoWorld in March 1986 rated Quicken for Apple II version A.11 as 7.0 out of 10, stating that it and AppleWorks worked together well to produce reports. Describing it as a powerful financial database, the magazine recommended the software to both individuals and small businesses.

MacUser in November 1988 rated Quicken for Macintosh as 4.5 mice out of 5, describing it as "probably the best home budgeting/accounting system on the market". The magazine approved of its checkbook paradigm and stated that it was suitable for small-business bookkeeping. Citing its "outstanding" adherence to Apple human interface guidelines and documentation, MacUser concluded "Quicken is a great program ... anyone who owns a Macintosh and has a checkbook should buy a copy".

The Los Angeles Times said in 1989 that even with a $10 price increase to $60, version 3 "is a better bargain than ever".

== See also ==
- GnuCash — free and open-source personal and small-business accounting software
