= Year-to-date =

Time period

Year-to-date (YTD) is the period starting from the beginning of the current year (either the calendar year or fiscal year) and continuing up to the present day.

== Overview ==
Year-to-date is used in various contexts to record the results of an activity from the beginning of the year up to the present day. This period excludes the current day if it is not yet complete.

In finance, YTD figures are often included in financial statements to detail the performance of a business entity. Providing YTD results for the current year, as well as for one or more past years as of the same date, allows owners, managers, investors, and other stakeholders to compare the company's current performance with that of previous periods. Employees' income tax may also be based on their total earnings year-to-date.

YTD can describe the return for an investment so far this year. For example, if a stock has a YTD return of 8%, it means that from January 1 of the current year to the present date, the stock has appreciated by 8%.

Another example: if a property has a fiscal year-end of March 31, 2009, and the YTD rental income as of June 30, 2008, is $1,000, this indicates that the property earned $1,000 in rental income from April 1 through June 30, 2008 (the YTD period for the property).

Comparing YTD measures can be misleading if only a small portion of the year has elapsed or if the date is not clear. YTD measures are more sensitive to changes early in the year than later in the year. In contrast, measures like the 12-month ending (or year-ending) are less affected by seasonal influences.

For example, to calculate year-to-date invoicing for a company, sum the invoice totals for each month of the current year up to the present date.

== Example ==
Example: YTD Invoicing report for May 3

 January Invoices-----$35,000
 February Invoices----  40,000
 March Invoices-------  25,000
 April Invoices-------  45,000
 May Invoices---------   5,000
                       _______
                              
 YTD Invoices          150,000

Alternate method:

 1st quarter Invoices-----$100,000
 April Invoices-----------   45,000
 May Invoices-------------    5,000
                            _______
                              
 YTD Invoices               150,000

Tax due as of the end of week 33 of the tax year is calculated on total pay from the beginning of week 1 until the end of week 33; tax payable for that week will be this total tax minus tax already paid.

   Quarter-To-Date (QTD)
   Month-To-Date (MTD)
   Year-ending
   Moving Annual Total (MAT)
