= Open Financial Exchange =

Financial information file format

- Filename extension: .ofx
- Internet media type: application/x-ofx
- Developed by: Microsoft, Intuit and CheckFree
- Initial release: February 14, 1997
- Latest release: 2.3; October 16, 2020
- Container for: Financial information
- Extended from: SGML, XML, OFC
- Extended to: QFX

Open Financial Exchange (OFX) is a data stream format for exchanging financial information that evolved from Microsoft's Open Financial Connectivity (OFC) and Intuit's Open Exchange file formats.

== History ==
Microsoft, Intuit and CheckFree announced the OFX standard on 16 January 1997. The first OFX specification, version 1.0, was released on 14 February 1997. The specification allows for bank- and application-specific extensions, although only a subset is necessary to describe a financial transaction.

Versions 1.0 through 1.6 relied on SGML for data exchange, while later versions are XML-based. In 2019, the OFX consortium joined the Financial Data Exchange (FDX) consortium that now manages the OFX specification. The latest reference document was published on October 16, 2020.

== OFX Uses ==
Many United States banks let customers use personal financial management software to automatically import their bank transactions using the OFX protocol. However, most Canadian, United Kingdom and Australian banks do not allow this. Nonetheless, many banks do support downloading financial data in the OFX file format, the QIF file format, or the spreadsheet format via their web interface. The resulting file may be imported into financial software.

== Intuit and QFX ==
QFX is a proprietary variant of OFX used in Intuit's products. In Intuit products, OFX is used for Direct Connect and QFX for Web Connect. Direct Connect allows personal financial management software to connect directly to a bank's OFX server. With Web Connect, the user logs in, manually downloads a .qfx file, and imports it into Quicken.

== See also ==
- Quicken Interchange Format
- ISO 20022
- FinTS (formerly HBCI)
