= List of finite element software packages =

This is a list of notable software packages that implement the finite element method for solving partial differential equations.

Software	Features	Developer	Version	Released	License	Price	Platform
agros	Multiplatform open source application for the solution of physical problems based on the deal.II library	University of West Bohemia	2025	2025-06-06	GNU GPL	Free	Linux, Windows
CalculiX	It is an Open Source FEA project. The solver uses a partially compatible ABAQUS file format. The pre/post-processor generates input data for many FEA and CFD applications	Guido Dhondt, Klaus Wittig	2.20	2022-08-01	GNU GPL	Free	Linux, Windows
DIANA FEA	General purpose finite element package utilised by civil, structural and geotechnical engineers.	DIANA FEA BV, The Netherlands	10.1	2016-11-14	Proprietary commercial software	Paid	Windows, Linux
deal.II	Comprehensive set of tools for finite element codes, scaling from laptops to clusters with 100,000+ cores. Written in C++, it supports all widely used finite element types, serial and parallel meshes, and h and hp adaptivity.	deal.II developer team	9.8	2026-08-09	LGPL, Apache License 2.0	Free	Linux, Unix, Mac OS X, Windows
DUNE	Distributed and Unified Numerics Environment, written in C++	DUNE Developer team	2.11.0	2026-02-07	GPL Version 2 with Run-Time Exception	Free	Linux, Unix, Mac OS X
Elmer FEM	Open source multiphysical simulation software developed by Finnish Ministry of Education's CSC, written primarily in Fortran (written in Fortran90, C and C++)	CSC	8.2	2021-03-04	GPL	Free	Linux, Mac OS X, Windows
FEBio	Finite Elements for Biomechanics	University of Utah (MRL), Columbia University (MBL)	3.7	June, 2022	MIT	Free	Linux, Mac OS X, Windows
FEniCS Project	Software package developed by American and European researchers with the goal to enable automated solution of differential equations	FEniCS Team	1.6.0	2015-07-29	LGPL (Core) & GPL/LGPL (Non-Core)	Free	Linux, Unix, Mac OS X, Windows
FEATool Multiphysics	MATLAB FEM and PDE multiphysics simulation toolbox	Precise Simulation	1.10	2019-05-17	Proprietary EULA	Free for personal use	Windows, Mac OS X, Linux, Unix
Flexcom	FEA software used in offshore oil and gas and offshore wind energy	Wood Group	2026.1.1	May 2026	Proprietary commercial software	Free student edition available	Windows
FreeFEM	FreeFEM is a free and open-source parallel FEA software for multiphysics simulations. The problems are defined in terms of their variational formulation and can be easily implemented using FreeFEM language. Written in C++.	Sorbonne University and Jacques-Louis Lions Laboratory	4.2.1	2019-06-06	LGPL	Free	Linux, MacOS, Windows, Solaris
GOMA	GOMA is an open-source, parallel, and scalable multiphysics software package for modeling and simulation of real-life physical processes, with a basis in computational fluid dynamics for problems with evolving geometry.	Sandia National Laboratories, University of New Mexico	6.1	Aug 28, 2015	GPL Version 2	Free	Linux
GetFEM++	A generic finite element library written in C++ with interfaces for Python, Matlab and Scilab. It focuses on modeling of contact mechanics and discontinuities (e.g. cracks).	Yves Renard, Julien Pommier	5.4.2	2022-07	LGPL	Free	Unix, Mac OS X, Windows
Hermes Project	Modular C/C++ library for rapid development of space- and space-time adaptive hp-FEM solvers	hp-FEM group	3.0	2014-03-01	LGPL	Free	Linux, Unix, Mac OS X, Windows
Mathematica	General purpose computation software.	Wolfram Research	15.0.1 (July 2026; 4 months ago) [±]	Regularly	Proprietary		Linux, Mac OS X, Windows, Raspbian, Online service.
MATLAB Partial Differential Equation Toolbox	MATLAB Toolbox for solving structural, thermal, electromagnetics, and other general PDEs	MathWorks	3.3 (R2019b)	2019-09-11	Proprietary commercial software		Linux, Mac OS X, Windows
MFEM	MFEM is a free, lightweight, scalable C++ library for finite element methods that features arbitrary high-order finite element meshes and spaces, support for a wide variety of discretizations, and emphasis on usability, generality, and high-performance computing efficiency.	MFEM team	4.10	2026-9-1	BSD	Free	Linux, Unix, Mac OS X, Windows
MoFEM JosePH	Mesh Oriented hp-FE code, written in C++	University of Glasgow	0.6.8	2017-11-16	LGPL	Free	Unix, Mac OS X
MOOSE	Object Oriented FE framework, written in C++	Idaho National Laboratory		regularly	LGPL	Free	Unix, Mac OS X
OOFEM	Object Oriented Finite EleMent solver, written in C++	Bořek Patzák	2.5	2017-12-30	GPL Version 2	Free	Unix, Windows
OpenSees	Open System for Earthquake Engineering Simulation		3.3.0	2021-05-24	Non Commercial	Free	Unix, Linux, Windows, Mac OS X
SESAM (FEM)	Software suite for structural and hydrodynamic analysis of ships and offshore structures	DNV GL		regularly	Proprietary, SaaS		Windows, Web browser
Range FEA	Multiphysics FEA: structural and modal analysis, heat transfer, CFD, electrostatics and magnetostatics. Integrated GUI, automatic tetrahedral meshing, geometry repair, pre/post-processing and 3D visualisation.	Tomáš Šoltys	1.3.1	2026-10-25	GNU GPL	Free	Linux, Windows, macOS
Z88/Z88Aurora	Freeware finite element package; The present version Z88Aurora V5 offers, in addition to static strength analysis modules such as non-linear strength calculations (large displacements), simulations with non-linear materials, natural frequency, static thermal analysis and a contact module.	Frank Rieg	Z88 V15, Z88Aurora V5	2017-07-17, 2019-04-01	GNU GPL, Custom	Free	Linux, Windows, Mac OS X
Abaqus	Advanced Franco-USA software from SIMULIA, owned by Dassault Systèmes	Abaqus Inc.	2023	2022-11	Proprietary commercial software	Free learning edition available, up to 1000 nodes	Linux, Windows
CONSELF	CAE simulation from your browser	CONSELF SRL	2.9	2015-10	SaaS	Freemium	Web browser
FreeCAD	Parametric 3D modeler with a FEM workbench allowing it to use external solvers like CalculiX, Z88, Elmer, and OpenFOAM	FreeCAD Team	0.20.1	10 August 2022	LGPL 2	Free	Linux, Windows, Mac OS X
ADINA	Finite element software for structural, fluid, heat transfer, electromagnetic, and multiphysics problems, including fluid-structure interaction and thermo-mechanical coupling	Adina R&D			Proprietary commercial software		
Autodesk Simulation	Finite Element software of Autodesk	Autodesk			Proprietary commercial software		Windows
ANSYS	US-based and -developed full CAE software package	Ansys Inc.	2022 R2	2022-07-28	Proprietary commercial software	Free student version available, up to 32,000 nodes/elements	Windows, Linux
COMSOL Multiphysics	COMSOL Multiphysics Finite Element Analysis Software (formerly FEMLAB)	COMSOL Inc.	6.1	2022-11-01	Proprietary EULA		Linux, Mac OS X, Windows, Web browser
CosmosWorks	Part of SolidWorks	Dassault Systèmes SolidWorks Corp.			Proprietary commercial software		Windows
Quickfield	EM, Heat Transfer and Stress Analysis	Tera Analysis Ltd	7.0	2025-09-15	Proprietary EULA	Free Student Edition available	Windows
Pam Crash	Best used for explicit dynamics / crash analysis	ESI	15.5.1	2020-03-05	Proprietary commercial software		Linux, Windows
LS-DYNA	Best known for explicit dynamics / crash analysis	LSTC - Livermore Software Technology Corporation	R10.1	2020	Proprietary commercial software		Linux, Windows
Mecway	Structural, heat transfer, electrostatic, acoustic	Mecway Limited	20.0	2023-07	Proprietary commercial software	Free edition available, up to 1000 nodes	Windows
Nastran	Originally developed for NASA, now available commercially from several software companies	MSC NASTRAN, Siemens PLM NX Nastran	2014	2014	Proprietary EULA		Linux, Mac OS X, Windows
RFEM	3D finite element analysis software	Dlubal Software	6.04.0005	2023-10-30	Proprietary commercial software	Free student license available	Windows
SimScale	German 100% web-based CAE platform	SimScale GmbH	14	2013-07	SaaS	Free community version available	Web browser
VisualFEA	Finite element software for structural, geotechnical, heat transfer and seepage analysis	Intuition Software	5.11	2016-01	Proprietary software	Free educational version available	Mac OS X, Windows
JCMsuite	Finite element software for the analysis of electromagnetic waves, elasticity and heat conduction	JCMwave GmbH	5.4.3	2023-03-09	Proprietary EULA		Linux, Windows
Radioss	Best known for explicit dynamics simulations	Altair Engineering			Proprietary commercial software; OpenRadioss: AGPL-3.0	Open-source version (OpenRadioss) available	Linux, Windows
JMAG	2D and 3D finite element analysis software for electromagnetic field, thermal, structural	JSOL	18.1	2019-06	Proprietary commercial software	Education pack available	Linux, Windows, Web browser

== Feature comparison ==
This table is contributed by a FEA-compare project, which provides an alternative view of this table with the first row and Feature column being fixed for ease of table exploration.

Feature	COMSOL Multiphysics	MFEM	GetFEM++	deal.II	Elmer	MOOSE	FEniCS Project	FEATool Multiphysics
license:	Proprietary	BSD	LGPL	LGPL	GNU (L)GPL	LGPL	GNU GPL\LGPL	Proprietary
GUI:	Yes	No	No	No	Yes, partial functionality	Yes	Postprocessing only	Matlab and Octave GUI
Documentation:	user guides, reference manuals, API documentation, application libraries with solved examples, online tutorials	examples, miniapps, Doxygen, online documentation	User doc, tutorials, demos, developer's guide	extensive tutorials, video lectures, Doxygen	ElmerSolver Manual, Elmer Models Manual, ElmerGUI Tutorials, etc. LaTeX documentation available in PDFs	Doxygen, Markdown, example codes, test inputs	Tutorial, demos, book	Online FEATool documentation, tutorials, and model examples
Mesh
mesh elements:	intervals (1D); triangles, quadrilaterals (2D and 3D boundaries); tetrahedra, pyramids, prisms, hexahedra (3d)	segments, triangles, quadrilaterals, tetrahedra, hexahedra, prisms, pyramids	intervals, triangles, tetrahedra, quads, hexes, prisms, some 4D elements, easily extensible.	intervals (1D); triangles, quadrilaterals (2D and 3D boundaries); tetrahedra, pyramids, prisms, hexahedra (3d)	intervals (1d), triangles, quadrilaterals (2d), tetrahedra, pyramids, wedges, hexahedra (3d)	Tria, Quad, Tetra, Prism, etc.	intervals, triangles, tetrahedra (quads, hexes - work in progress)	intervals, triangles, tetrahedra, quads, hexes
mesh high-order mapping:	Any? Second-order is the default for most cases.	arbitrary-order meshes and NURBS meshes		any order	Yes, for Lagrange elements		(Any - work in progress)	
mesh generation:	Built-in	meshing miniapps and target-matrix mesh optimization	experimental in any dimension + predefined shapes + Extrusion.	external mesh generators via mesh exchange files, internally generated meshes for simple shapes, internal interfaces to gmsh	Limited own meshing capabilities with ElmerGrid and netgen/tetgen APIs. Internal extrusion and mesh multiplication on parallel level.	Built-in	Yes, Constructive Solid Geometry (CSG) supported via mshr (CGAL and Tetgen used as backends)	Integrated DistMesh, Gmsh, and Triangle GUI and CLI interfaces
mesh adaptive-refinement:	Yes, full adaptive mesh refinement (h-refinement); no p-refinement but several higher-order elements are included. Mesh adaptation on the whole or parts of the geometry, for stationary, eigenvalue, and time-dependent simulations and by rebuilding the entire mesh or refining chosen mesh elements.	conforming and non-conforming adaptive refinement for tensor product and simplex meshes	Only h	h-, p-, and hp-adaptivity for both continuous and discontinuous finite elements	h-refinement for selected equations	h, p, mached hp, singular hp	Only h	
mesh input/output:	STL, PLY, NASTRAN, 3MF, VRML (import only), native format	VTK, Gmsh, CUBIT, NETGEN, TrueGrid, and MFEM format	gmsh, GiD, Ansys	DB, XDA, GMSH, Tecplot, UNV, UCD, Abaqus, VTK, Assimp, ExodusII		ExodusII, Nemesis, Abaqus, Ensight, Gmsh, GMV, OFF, TecPlot TetGen, etc.	XDMF (and FEniCS XML)	FeatFlow, FEniCS XML, GiD, Gmsh, GMV, Triangle
mesh check:	Avoids inverted and degenerated elements; various mesh quality measures		?				intersections (collision testing)	
CAD files support:	STEP, IGES, others.		No	IGES, STEP (with OpenCascade wrapper)	Limited support via OpenCASCADE in ElmerGUI			
mesh operation:	Merge, copy, refine; convert; boundary layers; extrude, revolve, sweep, loft for 3D geometries		Extrude, rotate, translation, refine	Extrude, rotate, translation, refine		Merge, join, extrude, modular mesh modifier system		Merge, join, extrude, and revolve operations
Parallel possibilities
automatic mesh partitioning:		METIS and space-filling curve partitioning	Yes (METIS)	yes, shared (METIS/Parmetis/Zoltan) and distributed (p4est)	partitioning with ElmerGrid using Metis or geometric division, internal partitioning in ElmerSolver using Zoltan	Metis, Parmetis, Hilbert (shared and distributed meshes)	Yes (ParMETIS and SCOTCH)	
MPI:	Yes	Yes	Yes	Yes (up to 310k processes)	Yes	Yes	Yes	
threads:	Supports multithreading	Using OpenMP, RAJA, or OCCA backends		Threading Build Blocks	threadsafe, some modules threaded and vectorized.	Yes		
OpenMP:	Yes	Yes	Yes	Yes (vectorization only)	Yes, partially	Yes		
OpenCL:	No	Through OCCA backends	No	No	No			
CUDA:	No	Yes	No	since 9.1, see step-64 for matrix-free GPU+MPI example	Preliminary API for sparse linear algebra			
Solver
Dimension:	0D, 1D, 2D, 3D (can coexist)	1D/2D/3D	Any, possibility to mix and couple problem of different dimension	1/2/3D	1D/2D/3D (dimensions may coexist)	1/2/3D	1/2/3D	1/2/3D
FE:	Lagrange (order 1-7), Hermite (order 3-7), discontinuous Lagrange (order 0-7), bubble, Gauss point, serendipity, Nedelec	Arbitrary-order Lagrange elements (continuous and discontinuous), Bernstein basis, Nedelec and Raviart-Thomas elements, support for NURBS spaces (IGA)	Continuous and discontinuous Lagrange, Hermite, Argyris, Morley, Nedelec, Raviart-Thomas, composite elements (HCT, FVS), Hierarchical elements, Xfem, easily extensible.	Lagrange elements of any order, continuous and discontinuous; Nedelec and Raviart-Thomas elements of any order; BDM and Bernstein; elements composed of other elements.	Lagrange elements, p-elements up to 10th order, Hcurl conforming elements (linear and quadratic) for	Lagrange, Hierarchic, Discontinuous Monomials, Nedelec	Lagrange, BDM, RT, Nedelic, Crouzeix-Raviart, all simplex elements in the Periodic Table (femtable.org), any	Lagrange (1st-5th order), Crouzeix-Raviart, Hermite
Quadrature:		Gauss-Legendre, Gauss-Lobatto, and uniform quadrature rules.		Gauss-Legendre, Gauss-Lobatto, midpoint, trapezoidal, Simpson, Milne and Weddle (closed Newton-Cotes for 4 and 7 order polynomials), Gauss quadrature with logarithmic or 1/R weighting function, Telles quadrature of arbitrary order.		Gauss-Legendre (1D and tensor product rules in 2D and 3D) tabulated up to 44th-order to high precision, best available rules for triangles and tetrahedra to very high order, best available monomial rules for quadrilaterals and hexahedra.		
Transient problems:	Yes, BDF, Runge-Kutta (RK34, Cash-Karp 5, Dormand-Prince 5), and generalized alpha time stepping	Runge-Kutta, SSP, SDIRK, Adams-Bashforth, Adams-Moulton, Symplectic Integration Algorithm, Newmark method, Generalized-alpha method		Any user implemented and/or from a set of predefined. Explicit methods: forward Euler, 3rd and 4th order Runge-Kutta. Implicit methods: backward Euler, implicit Midpoint, Crank-Nicolson, SDIRK. Embedded explicit methods: Heun-Euler, Bogacki-Shampine, Dopri, Fehlberg, Cash-Karp.		implicit-euler explicit-euler crank-nicolson bdf2 explicit-midpoint dirk explicit-tvd-rk-2 newmark-beta		BE, CN, and Fractional-Step-Theta schemes
Predefined equations:	Incompressible Navier-Stokes, heat transfer, convection-diffusion-reaction, linear elasticity, electromagnetics, pressure acoustics, Darcy's law, and support for custom PDE equations	Miniapps and examples for Laplace, elasticity, Maxwell, Darcy, advection, Euler, Helmholtz, and others		The tutorial provides examples for many different equations	Around 50 predefined solvers	Phase Field, Solid Mechanics, Navier-Stokes, Porous Flow, Level Set, Chemical Reactions, Heat Conduction, support for custom PDEs		Incompressible Navier-Stokes, Heat transfer, convection-diffusion-reaction, linear elasticity, electromagnetics, Darcy's, Brinkman equations, and support for custom PDE equations
Automated assembly:			Yes				Yes	Yes
Visualization:	Built-in	In situ visualization with GLVis. Export to VisIt and ParaView.	External or with the Scilab/Matlab/Python interface. Possibility to perform complex slices.	External (export to .vtk/.vtu and many others)	ElmerGUI comes VTK based visualization tool (but Paraview is recommended)	Yes, VTK-based GUI, Python visualizatuion library	Buil-in simple plotting + External	Built-in with optional Plotly and GMV export
Output format:	Text and unstructured VTK-file for data. BMP, PNG, GIF, TIFF, JPEG, glTF, Windows clipboard, Microsoft PowerPoint (for images). GIF, Flash, AVI, WebM (for animations). Touchstone data (for networks).	VisIt, ParaView (VTU), GLVis format	vtk, gmsh, OpenDX.	*.dx *.ucd *.gnuplot *.povray *.eps *.gmv *.tecplot *.tecplot_binary *.vtk *.vtu *.svg *.hdf5	Several output formats (VTU, gmsh,...)	ExodusII, Xdr, etc.	VTK(.pvd, .vtu) and XDMF/HDF5	GMV and Plotly
Boundary elements solver:	Yes		No	Yes	Existing but without multipole acceleration (not usable for large problems)		No	
Use multiple meshes:			Yes including different dimensions and taking account of any transformation.	Yes, autorefined from same initial mesh for each variable of a coupled problem	Continuity of non-conforming interfaces ensured by mortar finite elements		Yes, including non-matching meshes	
Linear algebra
Used libs:	MUMPS, PARDISO, SPOOLES; ARPACK, BLAS, BLIS, Intel MKL, LAPACK	Built-in and integrated with hypre. Optional integrations with PETSc, Ginkgo, SuperLU, Suite Sparse, libCEED, and more	SuperLU, MUMPS, Built-in.	Built-in + Trilinos, PETSc, and SLEPc	Built-in, Hypre, Trilinos, umfpack, MUMPS, Pardiso, etc. (optional)	PETSc, Trilinos, LASPack, SLEPc	PETSc, Trilinos/TPetra, Eigen.	Matlab/Octave built-in (Umfpack), supports integration with the FEniCS and FeatFlow solvers
Iterative matrix solvers:	GMRES, FGMRES, BiCGStab, conjugate gradients, TFQMR, or any precoditioner. Algebraic and geometric multigrid. Domain decomponsition (Schwarz, Schur)	Krylov methods (CG, MINRES, GMRES, BiCGStab)	All Krylov	All Krylov (CG, Minres, GMRES, BiCGStab, QMRS)	Built-in Krylov solvers, Krylov and multigrid solvers from external libraries	LASPack serial, PETSc parallel		Matlab/Octave built-in
Preconditioners:	Direct preconditioner, Krylov, SOR, SSOR, SORU, SOR line, SOR gauge, SOR vector, Jacobi, incomplete and hierarchical LU, SAI, SCGS, Vanka, AMS	Algebraic, Geometric, and p-multigrid. Block ILU preconditioning. Support for hypre's AMS and ADS preconditioners for H(curl) and H(div).	Basic ones (ILU, ILUT)	Many, including algebraic multigrid (via Hypre and ML) and geometric multigrid	Built-in preconditioners (ILU, diagonal, vanka, block) and	LASPack serial, PETSc parallel, algebraic multigrid (via Hypre)		Matlab/Octave built-in
Matrix-free
matrix-free:	Yes	Yes	No	Yes	Experimental implementation			
matrix-free save memory:		Yes	No	Yes				
matrix-free speed-up:		Yes	No	Yes				
Used language
Native language:	Primarily C++ and Java	C++	C++	C++	Fortran (2008 standard)	C++	C++	Matlab / Octave
Bindings to language:	Full API for Java and Matlab (the latter via add-on product)	PyMFEM (Python)	Python, Scilab or Matlab	Python bindings to some functionality			Python	
Other
Predefined equations:	Yes, many predefined physics and multiphysics interfaces in COMSOL Multiphysics and its add-ons.	A large number of Bilinear and Linear forms	Model bricks: Laplace, linear and nonlinear elasticity, Helmholtz, plasticity, Mindlin and K.L. plates, boundary conditions including contact with friction.					
Coupled nonlinear problems:	Yes	Yes	Yes					
Binary:	Windows, Linux, macOS	Yes, via OpenHPC. Also available as part of Spack, xSDK, E4S, FASTMath, RADIUSS and CEED.	Linux (Debian/Ubuntu)	Linux, Windows, Mac	Windows, Linux (launchpad: Debian/Ubuntu), Mac (homebrew) (all with MPI)		Linux (Debian\Ubuntu), Mac	Windows, Linux, Mac
fullname:		Modular Finite Element Methods			Elmer finite element software			
Testing:		Comprehensive unit and regression tests. Continuous integration through Travis CI		13,000+ tests	More than 700 consistency tests ensuring backward compatibility	4300+ tests, Testing as a service for derived applications		
scripting:	Full API for Java and, through add-on product, Matlab					Runtime parsed mathematical expression in input files		Fully scriptable in as m-file Matlab scripts and the GUI supports exporting models in script format
automatic differentiation:	Yes	Yes		Yes		Forward-mode for Jacobian computation, symbolic differentiation capabilities		
multiphysics:	Yes, full custom and predefined multiphysics couplings between all kinds of physics	Arbitrary multiphysics couplings are supported		Yes		Arbitrary multiphysics couplings are supported		Arbitrary multiphysics couplings are supported
Optimization Solvers:	With the Optimization Module add-on: Coordinate search, Nelder-Mead, Monte Carlo, BOBYQA, COBYLA, SNOPT, MMA, Levenberg-Marquardt	Integration with HiOp. Built-in SLBQP optimizer				Support for TAO- and nlopt-based constrained optimization solvers incorporating gradient and Hessian information.		
HIP:		Yes						
Symbolic derivation of the tangent system for nonlinear problems:			Yes	Yes				
Support for fictitious domain methods:			Yes	Yes				

== See also ==
- List of computational fluid dynamics software
