= Phase-field model =

Mathematical model

A phase-field model is a mathematical model for solving interfacial problems. It has mainly been applied to solidification dynamics, but it has also been applied to other situations such as viscous fingering, fracture mechanics, hydrogen embrittlement, and vesicle dynamics.

The method substitutes boundary conditions at the interface by a partial differential equation for the evolution of an auxiliary field (the phase field) that takes the role of an order parameter. This phase field takes two distinct values (for instance +1 and −1) in each of the phases, with a smooth change between both values in the zone around the interface, which is then diffuse with a finite width. A discrete location of the interface may be defined as the collection of all points where the phase field takes a certain value (e.g., 0).

A phase-field model is usually constructed in such a way that in the limit of an infinitesimal interface width (the so-called sharp interface limit) the correct interfacial dynamics are recovered. This approach permits to solve the problem by integrating a set of partial differential equations for the whole system, thus avoiding the explicit treatment of the boundary conditions at the interface.

Phase-field models were first introduced by Fix and Langer, and have experienced a growing interest in solidification and other areas. Langer, had handwritten notes where he showed you could use coupled Cahn-Hilliard and Allen-Cahn equations to solve a solidification problem. George Fix worked on programing problem. Langer felt, at the time, that the method was of no practical use since the interface thickness is so small compared to the size of a typical microstructure, so he never bothered publishing them.

== Equations of the phase-field model ==
Phase-field models are usually constructed in order to reproduce a given interfacial dynamics. For instance, in solidification problems the front dynamics is given by a diffusion equation for either concentration or temperature in the bulk and some boundary conditions at the interface (a local equilibrium condition and a conservation law), which constitutes the sharp interface model.

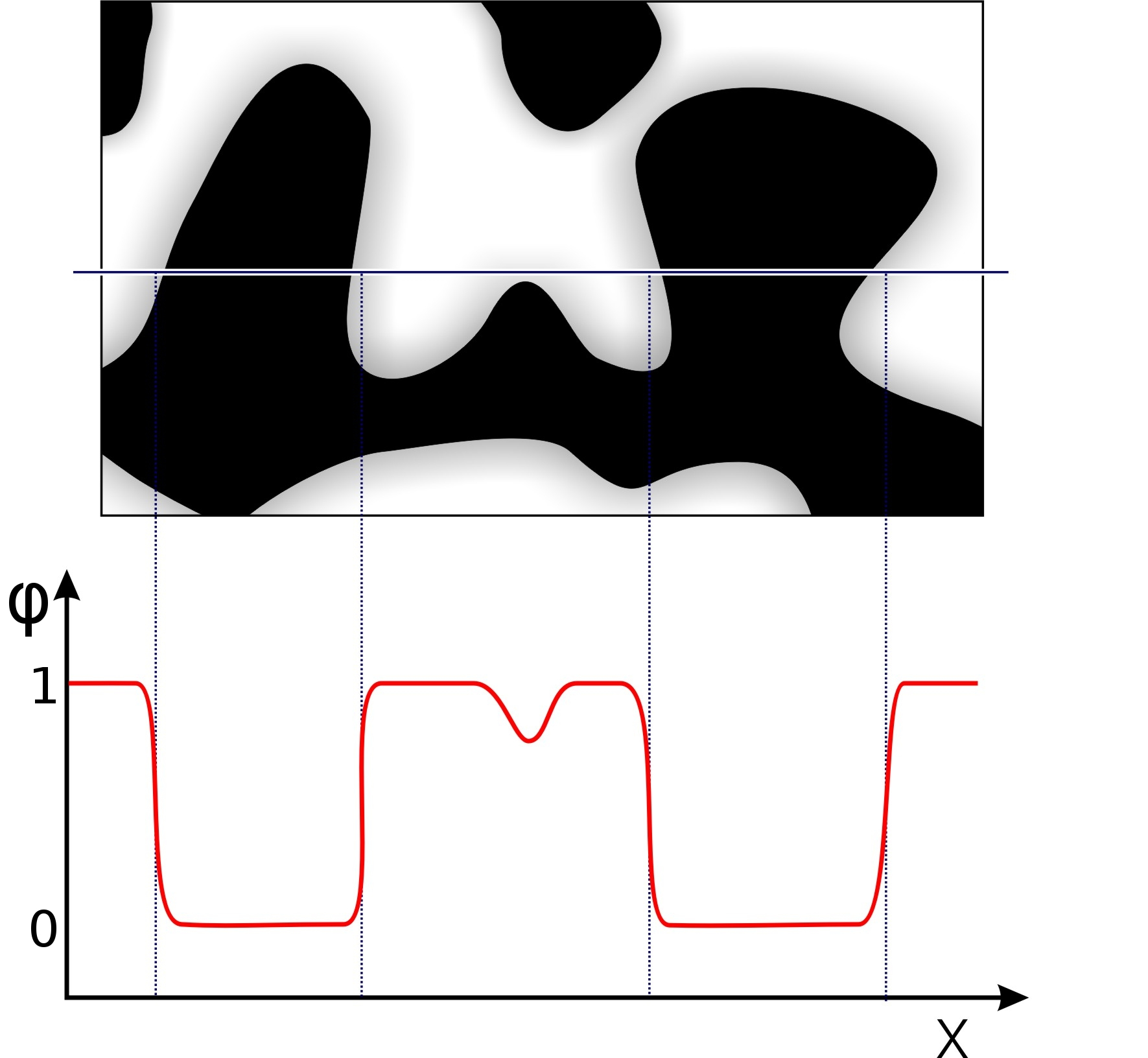
A two phase microstructure and the order parameter $\varphi$ profile is shown on a line across the domain. Gradual change of order parameter from one phase to another shows diffuse nature of the interface.

A number of formulations of the phase-field model are based on a free energy function depending on an order parameter (the phase field) and a diffusive field (variational formulations). Equations of the model are then obtained by using general relations of statistical physics. Such a function is constructed from physical considerations, but contains a parameter or combination of parameters related to the interface width. Parameters of the model are then chosen by studying the limit of the model with this width going to zero, in such a way that one can identify this limit with the intended sharp interface model.

Other formulations start by writing directly the phase-field equations, without referring to any thermodynamical functional (non-variational formulations). In this case the only reference is the sharp interface model, in the sense that it should be recovered when performing the small interface width limit of the phase-field model.

Phase-field equations in principle reproduce the interfacial dynamics when the interface width is small compared with the smallest length scale in the problem. In solidification this scale is the capillary length $d_o$, which is a microscopic scale. From a computational point of view integration of partial differential equations resolving such a small scale is prohibitive. However, Karma and Rappel introduced the thin interface limit, which permitted to relax this condition and has opened the way to practical quantitative simulations with phase-field models. With the increasing power of computers and the theoretical progress in phase-field modelling, phase-field models have become a useful tool for the numerical simulation of interfacial problems.

=== Variational formulations ===
A model for a phase field can be constructed by physical arguments if one has an explicit expression for the free energy of the system. A simple example for solidification problems is the following:

$$F[e,\varphi]=\int d{\mathbf r} \left[ K|{\mathbf\nabla}\varphi|^2 + h_0f(\varphi) + e_0u(\varphi)^2 \right]$$

where $\varphi$ is the phase field, $u(\varphi)=e/e_0 + h(\varphi)/2$, $e$ is the local enthalpy per unit volume, $h$ is a certain polynomial function of $\varphi$, and $e_0={L^2}/{T_M c_p}$ (where $L$ is the latent heat, $T_M$ is the melting temperature, and $c_{p}$ is the specific heat). The term with $\nabla\varphi$ corresponds to the interfacial energy. The function $f(\varphi)$ is usually taken as a double-well potential describing the free energy density of the bulk of each phase, which themselves correspond to the two minima of the function $f(\varphi)$. The constants $K$ and $h_{0}$ have respectively dimensions of energy per unit length and energy per unit volume. The interface width is then given by $W=\sqrt{K/h_0}$. The phase-field model can then be obtained from the following variational relations:

$$\partial_t \varphi = -\frac{1}{\tau} \left(\frac{\delta F}{\delta \varphi} \right) + \eta({\mathbf r},t)$$

$$\partial_t e = De_0\nabla^2 \left( \frac{\delta F}{\delta e} \right) - {\mathbf{\nabla}} \cdot{\mathbf q}_e(\mathbf r,t).$$

where D is a diffusion coefficient for the variable $e$, and $\eta$ and $\mathbf q_e$ are stochastic terms accounting for thermal fluctuations (and whose statistical properties can be obtained from the fluctuation dissipation theorem). The first equation gives an equation for the evolution of the phase field, whereas the second one is a diffusion equation, which usually is rewritten for the temperature or for the concentration (in the case of an alloy). These equations are, scaling space with $l$ and times with $l^2/D$:

$$\alpha \varepsilon^2\partial_t \varphi = \varepsilon^2\nabla^2\varphi- f'(\varphi) - \frac{e_0}{h_0} h'(\varphi)u+\tilde \eta({\mathbf r},t)$$

$$\partial_t u = \nabla^2 u+\frac{1}{2}h'(\varphi) \partial_t \varphi - \mathbf \nabla\cdot \mathbf q_u(\mathbf r,t)$$

where $\varepsilon=W/l$ is the nondimensional interface width, $\alpha={D\tau}/{W^2h_0}$, and $\tilde\eta({\mathbf r},t)$, $\mathbf q_u(\mathbf r,t)$ are nondimensionalized noises.

=== Alternative energy-density functions ===
The choice of free energy function, $f(\varphi)$, can have a significant effect on the physical behaviour of the interface, and should be selected with care. The double-well function represents an approximation of the Van der Waals equation of state near the critical point, and has historically been used for its simplicity of implementation when the phase-field model is employed solely for interface tracking purposes. But this has led to the frequently observed spontaneous drop shrinkage phenomenon, whereby the high phase miscibility predicted by an Equation of State near the critical point allows significant interpenetration of the phases and can eventually lead to the complete disappearance of a droplet whose radius is below some critical value. Minimizing perceived continuity losses over the duration of a simulation requires limits on the Mobility parameter, resulting in a delicate balance between interfacial smearing due to convection, interfacial reconstruction due to free energy minimization (i.e. mobility-based diffusion), and phase interpenetration, also dependent on the mobility. A recent review of alternative energy density functions for interface tracking applications has proposed a modified form of the double-obstacle function which avoids the spontaneous drop shrinkage phenomena and limits on mobility, with comparative results provide for a number of benchmark simulations using the double-well function and the volume-of-fluid sharp interface technique. The proposed implementation has a computational complexity only slightly greater than that of the double-well function, and may prove useful for interface tracking applications of the phase-field model where the duration/nature of the simulated phenomena introduces phase continuity concerns (i.e. small droplets, extended simulations, multiple interfaces, etc.).

=== Sharp interface limit of the phase-field equations ===
A phase-field model can be constructed to purposely reproduce a given interfacial dynamics as represented by a sharp interface model. In such a case the sharp interface limit (i.e. the limit when the interface width goes to zero) of the proposed set of phase-field equations should be performed. This limit is usually taken by asymptotic expansions of the fields of the model in powers of the interface width $\varepsilon$. These expansions are performed both in the interfacial region (inner expansion) and in the bulk (outer expansion), and then are asymptotically matched order by order. The result gives a partial differential equation for the diffusive field and a series of boundary conditions at the interface, which should correspond to the sharp interface model and whose comparison with it provides the values of the parameters of the phase-field model.

Whereas such expansions were in early phase-field models performed up to the lower order in $\varepsilon$ only, more recent models use higher order asymptotics (thin interface limits) in order to cancel undesired spurious effects or to include new physics in the model. For example, this technique has permitted to cancel kinetic effects, to treat cases with unequal diffusivities in the phases, to model viscous fingering and two-phase Navier–Stokes flows, to include fluctuations in the model, etc.

== Multiphase-field models ==
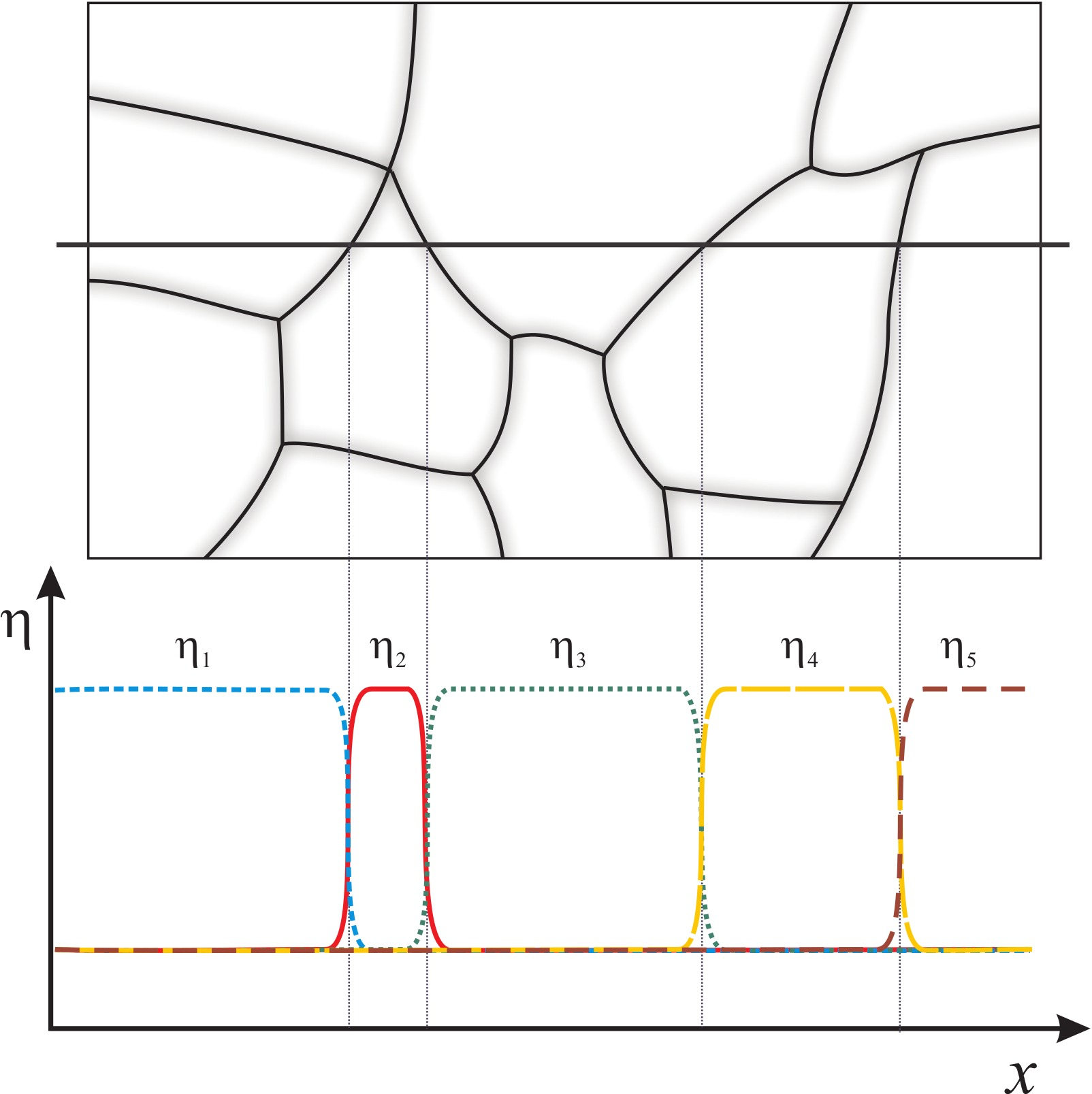
Multiple-order parameters describe a polycrystalline material microstructure.

In multiphase-field models, microstructure is described by set of order parameters, each of which is related to a specific phase or crystallographic orientation. This model is mostly used for solid-state phase transformations where multiple grains evolve (e.g. grain growth, recrystallization or first-order transformation like austenite to ferrite in ferrous alloys). Besides allowing the description of multiple grains in a microstructure, multiphase-field models especially allow for consideration of multiple thermodynamic phases occurring e.g. in technical alloy grades.

== Phase-field models on graphs ==
Many of the results for continuum phase-field models have discrete analogues for graphs, just replacing calculus with calculus on graphs.

== Phase Field Modeling in Fracture Mechanics ==
Fracture in solids is often numerically analyzed within a finite element context using either discrete or diffuse crack representations. Approaches using a finite element representation often make use of strong discontinuities embedded at the intra-element level and often require additional criteria based on, e.g., stresses, strain energy densities or energy release rates or other special treatments such as virtual crack closure techniques and remeshing to determine crack paths. In contrast, approaches using a diffuse crack representation retain the continuity of the displacement field, such as continuum damage models and phase-field fracture theories. The latter traces back to the reformulation of Griffith's principle in a variational form and has similarities to gradient-enhanced damage-type models. Perhaps the most attractive characteristic of phase-field approaches to fracture is that crack initiation and crack paths are automatically obtained from a minimization problem that couples the elastic and fracture energies. In many situations, crack nucleation can be properly accounted for by following branches of critical points associated with elastic solutions until they lose stability. In particular, phase-field models of fracture can allow nucleation even when the elastic strain energy density is spatially constant. A limitation of this approach is that nucleation is based on strain energy density and not stress. An alternative view based on introducing a nucleation driving force seeks to address this issue.

== Phase Field Models for Collective Cell Migration ==
An example simulation for 3D collective cell interactions using the Celadro-3D software based on multiphase fields approach.

A group of biological cells can self-propel in a complex way due to the consumption of Adenosine triphosphate. Interactions between cells like cohesion or several chemical cues can produce movement in a coordinated manner, a phenomenon denoted as "Collective cell migration". A theoretical model for these phenomena is the phase-field model and incorporates a phase field for each cell species and additional field variables like chemotactic agent concentration. Such a model can be used for phenomena like cancer, cell extrusion, wound healing, morphogenesis and ectoplasm phenomena.

== Phase Field Models for Metal Electrodeposition ==
The morphological evolution of metal electrodeposition has been simulated by phase-fields, helping researchers understand how process parameters like ion concentration and applied voltage influence the formation of structures such as dendrites. The first comprehensive phase-field model for electrochemical systems was developed by Guyer et al., which successfully captured the formation of the interfacial double layer by solving the complete set of Poisson-Nernst-Planck (PNP) equations. To overcome the computational limitations of resolving such small length scales, subsequent models introduced simplifications like the local electroneutrality condition, allowing for the simulation of larger, micron-scale microstructures. Further advancements integrated nonlinear Butler-Volmer kinetics to more accurately reflect the relationship between overpotential and interface growth velocity. More recently, researchers like Cogswell have expanded these frameworks by incorporating Marcus kinetics for electron transfer in concentrated solutions, providing a more robust thermodynamic description of dendritic growth.

== Software ==
- PACE3D – Parallel Algorithms for Crystal Evolution in 3D is a parallelized phase-field simulation package including multi-phase multi-component transformations, large scale grain structures and coupling with fluid flow, elastic, plastic and magnetic interactions. It is developed at the Karlsruhe University of Applied Sciences and Karlsruhe Institute of Technology.
- The Mesoscale Microstructure Simulation Project (MMSP) is a collection of C++ classes for grid-based microstructure simulation.
- The MICRostructure Evolution Simulation Software (MICRESS) is a multi-component, multiphase-field simulation package coupled to thermodynamic and kinetic databases. It is developed and maintained by ACCESS e.V .
- MOOSE massively parallel open source C++ multiphysics finite-element framework with support for phase-field simulations developed at Idaho National Laboratory.
- PhasePot is a Windows-based microstructure simulation tool, using a combination of phase-field and Monte Carlo Potts models.
- MedeA PhaseField is a commercial code for Windows and Linux which solves phase-field equations and is driven by a graphical user interface.
- OpenPhase is an open source software for the simulation of microstructure formation in systems undergoing first order phase transformation based on the multiphase field model.
- mef90/vDef is an open source variational phase-field fracture simulator based on the theory developed in.
- MicroSim is a software stack that consists of phase-field codes that offer flexibility with discretization, models as well as the high-performance computing hardware(CPU/GPU) that they can execute on.
- PRISMS-PF is a massively parallel finite element code for conducting phase-field and other related simulations of microstructure evolution. It is based on the deal.II finite element library and developed and maintained by the PRISMS Center at the University of Michigan.
- Celadro-3D is a three-dimensional extension of Celadro that utilizes multiphase-field modeling to capture the collective dynamics of active liquid droplets, such as living cells, offering a flexible platform to incorporate physics-based models for active matter.
- FEniCS is an open-source library for solving partial differential equations (PDEs) with the finite element method (FEM) which can be used for Phase-Field simulations.
