= Deal.II =

Open-source library for computing

deal.II
- Release: 2000; 26 years ago
- Stable release: 9.8.0 / 9 August 2026; 3 months ago
- Written in: C++
- Operating system: Linux, macOS, Microsoft Windows
- Type: Finite element analysis
- License: GNU Lesser General Public License 2.1 or later
- Website: dealii.org
- Repository: github.com/dealii/dealii

deal.II is a free, open-source library to solve partial differential equations using the finite element method. The current release is version 9.8, released in August 2026. The founding authors of the project — Wolfgang Bangerth, Ralf Hartmann, and Guido Kanschat — won the 2007 J. H. Wilkinson Prize for Numerical Software for deal.II. The library's then-developers also won the 2025 SIAM/ACM Computational Science and Engineering Prize. Today, it is a worldwide project managed by around a dozen "Principal Developers"; over the years several hundred people have contributed substantial pieces of code or documentation to the project.

== Features ==
The library features

- dimension independent programming using C++ templates on locally adapted meshes,
- a large collection of different finite elements of any order: continuous and discontinuous Lagrange elements, Nedelec elements, Raviart-Thomas elements, and combinations,
- parallelization using multithreading through TBB and massively parallel using MPI. deal.II has been shown to scale to at least 16,000 processors and has been used in applications on up to 300,000 processor cores.
- multigrid method with local smoothing on adaptively refined meshes
- hp-FEM
- extensive documentation and tutorial programs,
- interfaces to several libraries including Gmsh, PETSc, Trilinos, METIS, SUNDIALS, VTK, p4est, BLAS, LAPACK, HDF5, NetCDF, and Open Cascade Technology.

== History and impact ==
The software started from work at the Numerical Methods Group at Heidelberg University in Germany in 1998. The first public release was version 3.0.0 in 2000. Since then deal.II has gotten contributions from several hundred authors and has been used in more than 2,400 research publications.

In March 2025, the principal developers of the project received the SIAM/ACM Prize in Computational Science and Engineering for their "highly impactful library supporting finite element calculations. The software achieved a very high standard of software quality and modularity by providing packaged algorithms and data structures in a comprehensive and well-documented manner that enables and elevates whole communities to achieve more computationally advanced models than they could possibly otherwise."

The primary maintainers, coordinating the worldwide development of the library, are today located at Colorado State University, Clemson University, Texas A&M University, Oak Ridge National Laboratory and a number of other institutions. It is developed as a worldwide community of contributors through GitHub that incorporates several hundred changes by dozens of authors every month.

== See also ==
- List of finite element software packages
- List of numerical analysis software
- List of open-source mathematical libraries
