= MFEM =

Open-source C++ library

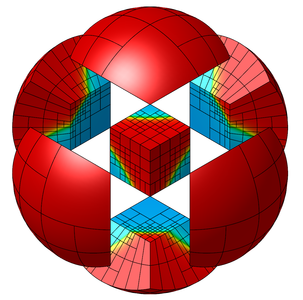
- The logo of MFEM shows some of its features: curvilinear elements, adaptive mesh refinement and parallel partitioning.
- Stable release: 4.10 / September 1, 2026; 1 day ago
- Written in: C++
- Operating system: Linux, MacOS, Microsoft Windows
- Type: Finite element analysis
- License: BSD
- Website: mfem.org
- Repository: https://github.com/mfem/mfem

MFEM is an open-source C++ library for solving partial differential equations using the finite element method, developed and maintained by researchers at the Lawrence Livermore National Laboratory and the MFEM open-source community on GitHub. MFEM is free software released under a BSD license.

The library consists of C++ classes that serve as building blocks for developing finite element solvers applicable to problems of fluid dynamics, structural mechanics, electromagnetics, radiative transfer and many other.

== Features ==
Some of the features of MFEM include

- Arbitrary high order finite elements with curved boundaries.
- H^{1}, H(curl) and H(div) conforming, discontinuous (L_{2}), and NURBS finite element spaces.
- Local mesh refinement, both conforming (simplex meshes) and non-conforming (quadrilateral/hexahedral meshes).
- Highly scalable MPI-based parallelism and GPU acceleration.
- Wide variety of finite element discretization approaches, including Galerkin, discontinuous Galerkin, mixed, high-order and isogeometric analysis methods.
- Tight integration with the Hypre parallel linear algebra library.
- Many built-in solvers and interfaces to external libraries such as PETSc, SuiteSparse, Gmsh, etc.
- Accurate and flexible visualization with VisIt and ParaView.
- Lightweight design and conservative use of C++ templating.
- Documentation in the form of examples and mini-applications.

== See also ==
- List of computational fluid dynamics software
- List of finite element software packages
- List of numerical analysis software
- List of numerical libraries
- List of open-source mathematical libraries
