= OOFEM =

- Original author: Bořek Patzák
- Stable release: 2.5 / December 30, 2017
- Operating system: Unix, Windows
- Type: Finite element analysis
- License: LGPL
- Website: oofem.org

OOFEM is a free and open-source multi-physics finite element code with object oriented architecture. The aim of the project is to provide a tool for FEM computations, as well as to offer a modular environment for development.

== Main features ==
- Solves various linear and nonlinear problems from structural, thermal and fluid mechanics.
- Particularly includes many material models for nonlinear fracture mechanics of quasibrittle materials, such as concrete.
- Efficient parallel processing support based on domain decomposition and message passing paradigms.
- Direct as well as iterative solvers are available. Direct solvers include symmetric and unsymmetric skyline solver and sparse direct solver. Iterative solvers support many sparse storage formats and come with various preconditioners. Interfaces to third party linear and eigen value solver libraries are available, including IML, PETSc, SLEPc, and SPOOLES.
- Support for Extended Finite Elements (XFEM) and iso-geometric analysis (IGA).

== License ==
OOFEM is free, open source software, released under the GNU Lesser General Public License version 2.1 on any later version

== See also ==
- List of numerical analysis software
- List of finite element software packages

== Community resources ==
- OOFEM forum
- OOFEM wiki
