= Barry H.V. Topping =

British computer scientist

- Born: 14 February 1952 (age 74); Manchester, England
- Education: City University London
- Known for: Computational Mechanics
- Awards: Telford Premium by the Institution of Civil Engineers; Best Paper Award by the Journal of Computing in Civil Engineering, American Society of Civil Engineers
- Scientific career
- Fields: Computational mechanics

Barry H.V. Topping FIMA (born 14 February 1952) is a British authority on computational mechanics. He was Professor of Computational Mechanics at the School of Engineering and Physical Sciences at Heriot-Watt University where his work was mainly concerned with parallel computing, genetic algorithms, neural networks, finite element methods and fluid-structure interaction. He is now emeritus Professor at Heriot-Watt University and an honorary professor at the University of Pécs in Hungary.

== Education ==
Barry Hilary Valentine Topping was born in Manchester on 14 February 1952. He was educated at Bedford Modern School and City University London where he obtained a PhD in Civil engineering in 1978.

== Academic positions ==
Between 1978 and 1988, Topping was lecturer in Civil Engineering at the University of Edinburgh and during that time was also made a Von-Humboldt Research Fellow at the University of Stuttgart between 1986 and 1987. After the University of Edinburgh he continued his career at Heriot-Watt University becoming Senior Lecturer between 1988 and 1989, Reader and then Professor of Structural Engineering between 1990 and 1995 and Professor of Computational Mechanics between 1995 and 2006. He is now emeritus Professor at Heriot-Watt University and an honorary professor at the University of Pécs in Hungary.

== Research work ==
Topping has two main research fields. The first is related to ‘applied algorithms in structural design’: parallel computing, genetic algorithms, neural networks and finite element methods. The second is concerned with structural analysis: ‘design of cable membrane structures, structures subject to transient dynamic loading’ and fluid-structure interaction.

== Authorship and editorial work ==
Topping is the author or editor of over 100 technical publications covering various aspects of engineering computation, and was the founding editor of two publications: Structural Engineering Review and the International Journal of Computing Systems in Engineering. He is co-editor of the International Journal of Computers and Structures and the International Journal of Advances in Engineering Software, both published by Elsevier Science.

== Awards ==
In 1990 Topping was awarded a Telford Premium by the Institution of Civil Engineers for his paper Theorems Of Geometric Variation For Engineering Structures.

In 2001 Topping received the Best Paper Award by the Journal of Computing in Civil Engineering (American Society of Civil Engineers) in respect of his paper Transient Dynamic Nonlinear Analysis Using MIMD Computer Architectures.

== Selected bibliography ==
- Topping, B.H.V., Muylle, J., Ivan´ yi, P., Putanowicz, R., Cheng, B., Finite Element Mesh Generation, Saxe-Coburg Publications, Stirling, 2004
- Topping, B.H.V., Bahreininejad, A., Neural Computing for Structural Mechanics, Saxe-Coburg Publications, Edinburgh, UK, 1997
- Topping, B.H.V., Khan, A.I., Parallel Finite Element Computations, Saxe-Coburg Publications, Edinburgh, UK, 1996
