= FEniCS Project =

Computing platform for solving partial differential equations

- Stable release: 0.9.0 (October 10, 2024; 23 months ago) [±]
- Operating system: Linux, OS X, Unix, WSL
- Available in: C++, Python
- Type: Scientific simulation software
- License: GNU Lesser General Public License
- Website: www.fenicsproject.org

The FEniCS Project is a collection of free and open-source software components with the common goal to enable automated solution of differential equations. The components provide scientific computing tools for working with computational meshes, finite-element variational formulations of ordinary and partial differential equations, and numerical linear algebra.

== Design and components ==
The FEniCS Project is designed as an umbrella project for a collection of interoperable components. The core components are

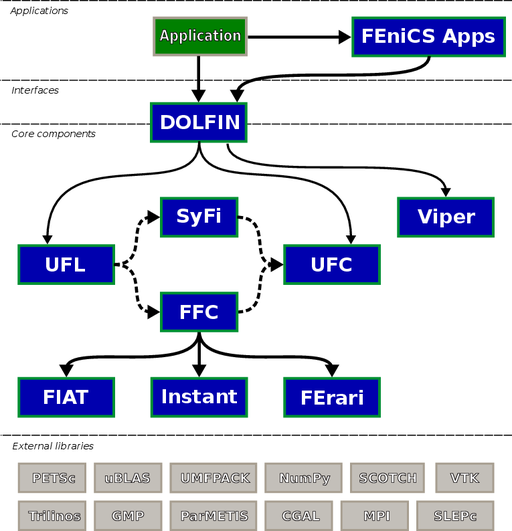
A schematic overview of the FEniCS components and their interplay

- UFL (unified form language), a domain-specific language embedded in Python for specifying finite element discretizations of differential equations in terms of finite element variational forms;
- FIAT (finite element automatic tabulator), the finite element backend of FEniCS, a Python module for generation of arbitrary order finite element basis functions on simplices;
- FFC (fenics form compiler), a compiler for finite element variational forms taking UFL code as input and generating UFC output;
- UFC (unified form-assembly code), a C++ interface consisting of low-level functions for evaluating and assembling finite element variational forms;
- Instant, a Python module for inlining C and C++ code in Python;
- DOLFIN, a C++/Python library providing data structures and algorithms for finite element meshes, automated finite element assembly, and numerical linear algebra.

DOLFIN, the computational high-performance C++ backend of FEniCS, functions as the main problem-solving environment (in both C++ and Python) and user interface. Its functionality integrates the other FEniCS components and handles communication with external libraries such as PETSc, Trilinos and Eigen for numerical linear algebra, ParMETIS and SCOTCH for mesh partitioning, and MPI and OpenMP for distributed computing.

As of May 2022, DOLFINx is the recommended user-interface of the FEniCS project.

== History ==
The FEniCS Project was initiated in 2003 as a research collaboration between the University of Chicago and Chalmers University of Technology. The following institutions are currently, or have been, actively involved in the development of the project

- Argonne National Laboratory
- Chalmers University of Technology
- Charles University
- Delft University of Technology
- Royal Institute of Technology
- Simula Research Laboratory
- University of Cambridge
- University of Chicago
- University of Luxembourg

== DOLFINx ==
Since 2019, the core components of the FEniCS project have received a major refactoring, resulting in DOLFINx. DOLFINx supports many new features not available in the old DOLFIN interface, including:

- Arbitrary degree finite elements on interval, triangle, quadrilateral, tetrahedral and hexahedral cells, including unstructured meshes without special ordering;
- Meshes with flat or curved cells;
- Custom partitioning of cells across multiple processes;
- Parallel IO via Gmsh, VTK, PyVista, and ADIOS2;
- Assembly and solvers using different floating point scalar types, including complex types;
- Assembly of custom element kernels written using Numba;
- Interpolation of functions into arbitrary function spaces;
- Interpolation between function spaces built on different (non-matching) meshes, including meshes using non-affine geometry;
- Ability to non-intrusively support different linear algebra backends, e.g., NumPy, PETSc, Trilinos, and Eigen;
- User-defined finite elements.

== See also ==
- List of finite element software packages
- List of numerical analysis software
- Using the FEATool Multiphysics GUI to set up and solve FEniCS multiphysics models
- DefElement: An encyclopedia of finite element definitions
