= Z88 =

Z88 may refer to:

- Z88 FEM software, a finite element software package
- Cambridge Z88, a 1988 portable Z80-based computer
- Vektor Z88, a South Africa clone of the Beretta 92F
