= PDE-constrained optimization =

PDE-constrained optimization is a subset of mathematical optimization where at least one of the constraints may be expressed as a partial differential equation. Typical domains where these problems arise include aerodynamics, computational fluid dynamics, image segmentation, and inverse problems. A standard formulation of PDE-constrained optimization encountered in a number of disciplines is given by:
$$\min_{y,u} \; \frac 1 2 \|y-\widehat{y}\|_{L_2(\Omega)}^2 + \frac\beta2 \|u\|_{L_2(\Omega)}^2, \quad \text{s.t.} \; \mathcal{D}y = u$$
where $u$ is the control variable and $\|\cdot\|_{L_{2}(\Omega)}^{2}$ is the squared Euclidean norm and is not a norm itself. Closed-form solutions are generally unavailable for PDE-constrained optimization problems, necessitating the development of numerical methods.

== Applications ==
- Aerodynamic shape optimization
- Drug delivery
- Mathematical finance
- Epidemiology

=== Optimal control of bacterial chemotaxis system ===
The following example comes from p. 20-21 of Pearson. Chemotaxis is the movement of an organism in response to an external chemical stimulus. One problem of particular interest is in managing the spatial dynamics of bacteria that are subject to chemotaxis to achieve some desired result. For a cell density $z(t,{\bf x})$ and concentration density $c(t,{\bf x})$ of a chemoattractant, it is possible to formulate a boundary control problem:
$$\min_{z,c,u} \; {1\over{2}}\int_{\Omega}\left[z(T,{\bf x})-\widehat{z} \right]^{2} + {\gamma_{c}\over{2}} \int_{\Omega}\left[c(T,{\bf x})-\widehat{c} \right]^{2} + {\gamma_{u}\over{2}}\int_{0}^{T}\int_{\partial\Omega}u^{2}$$
where $\widehat{z}$ is the ideal cell density, $\widehat{c}$ is the ideal concentration density, and $u$ is the control variable. This objective function is subject to the dynamics:
$$\begin{aligned}
{\partial z\over{\partial t}} - D_{z}\Delta z - \alpha \nabla \cdot \left[ {\nabla c\over{(1+c)^{2}}}z \right] &= 0 \quad \text{in} \quad \Omega \\
{\partial c\over{\partial t}} - \Delta c + \rho c - w{z^{2}\over{1+z^{2}}} &= 0 \quad \text{in} \quad \Omega \\
{\partial z\over{\partial n}} &= 0 \quad \text{on} \quad \partial\Omega \\
{\partial c\over{\partial n}} + \zeta (c-u) &= 0 \quad \text{on} \quad \partial\Omega
\end{aligned}$$
where $\Delta$ is the Laplace operator.

== See also ==
- Multiphysics
- Shape optimization
- SU2 code
