= TetGen =

Mesh generator

- Developer(s): Hang Si
- Stable release: 1.6 / 2020-12-01
- Written in: ANSI C++
- Operating system: Unix/Linux, OS X, Windows
- License: GNU Affero General Public License v.3.0
- Website: http://tetgen.org/

TetGen is a mesh generator developed by Hang Si which is designed to partition any 3D geometry into tetrahedrons by employing a form of Delaunay triangulation whose algorithm was developed by the author.

TetGen has since been incorporated into other software packages such as Mathematica and Gmsh.

Some improvements by speed in quality in Version 1.6 were introduced.

== See also ==
- Gmsh
- Salome (software)
