= Lois Curfman McInnes =

American mathematician

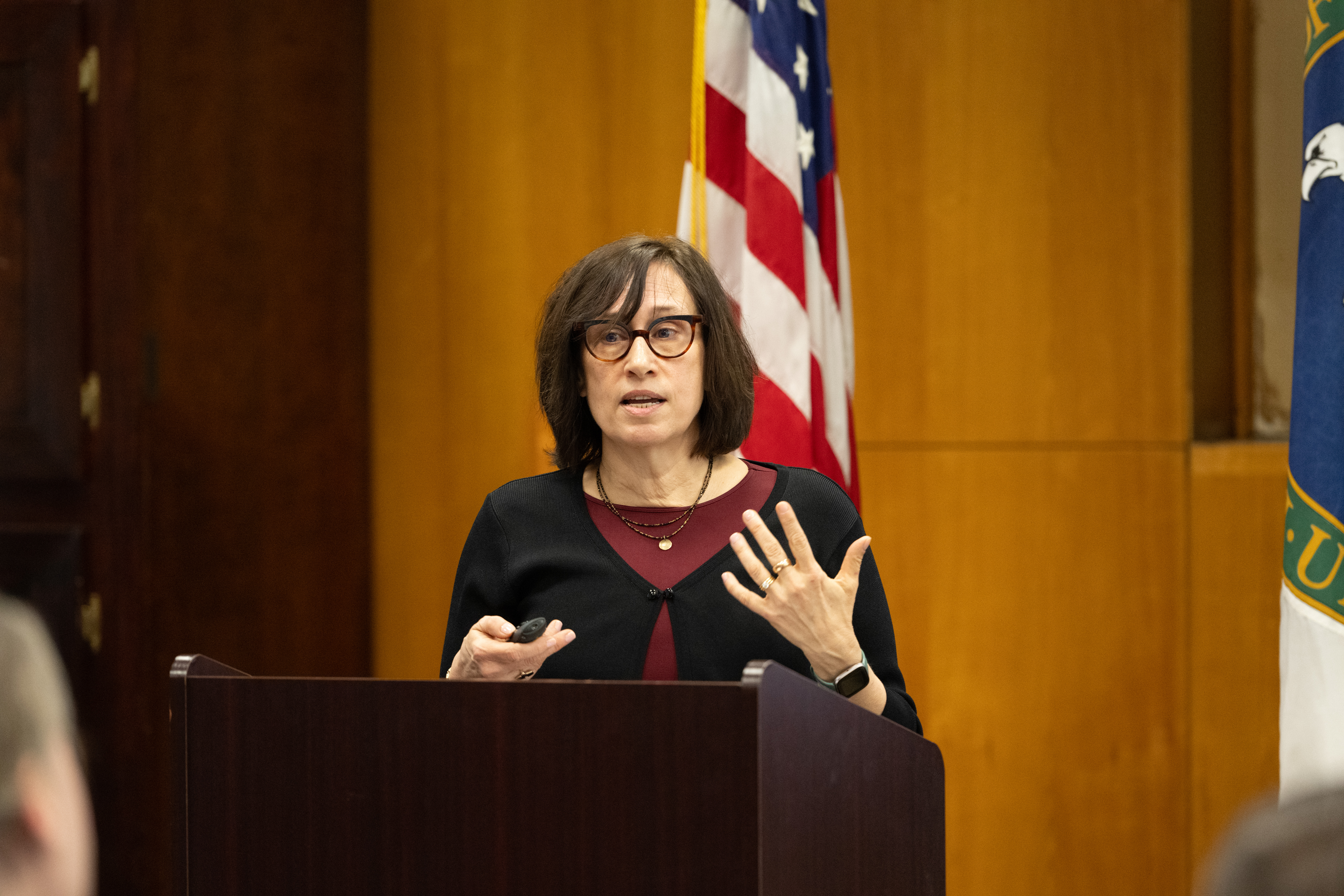
- Education: Muhlenberg College; University of Virginia
- Scientific career
- Institutions: Argonne National Laboratory

Lois Virginia Curfman McInnes is an American applied mathematician who works as a senior computational scientist at Argonne National Laboratory, where she works on the numerical solution of nonlinear partial differential equations for scientific applications.

== Education and career ==
McInnes graduated in 1988 from Muhlenberg College, with a double major in mathematics and physics. She completed her doctorate in applied mathematics in 1993 at the University of Virginia; her dissertation, Solution of Convective-Diffusive Flow Problems with Newton-Like Methods, was supervised by James McDonough Ortega. She was chair of the SIAM Activity Group on Computational Science and Engineering for 2015–2016. In 2021, she will join the SIAM council as a Member-at-Large. In 2022, she was elected Chair of the Society for Industrial and Applied Mathematics Activity Group on Supercomputing (SIAM SIAG/SC).

== Recognition ==
She won the Ernest Orlando Lawrence Award of the DOE Office of Science in 2011. She and her co-developers of the Portable, Extensible Toolkit for Scientific Computation were also honored in 2015 with the SIAM/ACM Prize in Computational Science and Engineering. She was elected as a fellow of the Society for Industrial and Applied Mathematics (SIAM) in 2017, "for contributions to scalable numerical algorithms and software libraries for solving large-scale scientific and engineering problems".
