= JMAG =

- Developer: JSOL Corporation
- Stable release: Version 23.2 / 2024-09
- Operating system: Cross-platform; Windows; Linux
- Available in: English; Japanese; Chinese^{[a]}
- Type: Finite Element Analysis CAD
- Website: jmag-international.com

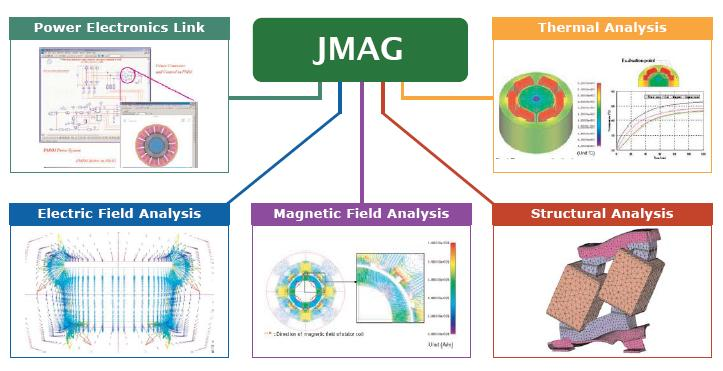
JMAG resources

JMAG is a simulation software used to develop and design electric devices. JMAG was originally released in 1983 as a tool to support the design of devices such as motors, actuators, circuit components, and antennas.

JMAG incorporates simulation technology to accurately analyze a wide range of physical phenomena that include complicated geometry, various material properties, structure at the center of electromagnetic fields and thermal properties. JMAG has an interface capable of linking to third-party software and a portion of the JMAG analysis functions can also be executed from many of the major CAD and CAE systems.

JMAG is actively used to analyze designs at a system level that includes drive circuits by utilizing links to power electronic simulators. Engineers use JMAG for the development of drive motors for electric vehicles.

== History ==
- 1983 – JMAG Version 1 was released as a 3D static magnetic field analysis software.
- 1986 – JMAG DYN was released including 3D transient magnetic field analysis.
- 1994 – JMAG-Works was released integrating electromagnetic and thermal analysis.
- 1998 – JMAG-Studio was released as an integrated electromagnetic analysis software native to Windows.
- 2000 – Coupled analyses were implemented for control simulation.
- 2002 – JMAG-Designer was developed as an add-on for SolidWorks.
- 2004 – JMAG RT-Solutions was developed for model-based development of motor drive systems.
- 2007 – JMAG Motor Template 2 was developed for creating motor templates by specifying basic parameters such as the geometry and the windings.
- 2009 – JMAG Motor Bench and JMAG Transformer Design and Evaluation tools were developed to improve the manufacturing of devices.
- 2018 – JMAG-Express Online was released as a Free tool for designing and evaluating motor on a web browser.

== See also ==
- Computer-aided engineering
- Finite element analysis
- List of finite element software packages

== Notes ==
^{a} Not officially supported
