= Mecway =

Finite element analysis software

Mecway is a finite-element analysis (FEA) application for Windows. which focuses on mechanical and thermal simulation. For thermal simulation, it allows convection, radiation boundary conditions, and temperature dependent thermal properties. Structural (mechanical) analysis capabilities are linear static, non-linear static, multi-body contact, dynamic, composite materials, modal analysis and buckling. There is also acoustic modal analysis.

Mecway imports STEP files and meshes generated by Netgen and Gmsh and DXF.

The free version is limited to 1000 nodes, while the (low-cost) paid-version has unlimited nodes.

== Usage ==
The procedure to build a model involves selecting global properties such as "dynamic response axisymmetric", importing or creating the geometry, defining one or more components and material properties for each, applying loads and constraints, and finally solving. A mesh can be created by defining nodes by their coordinates then clicking those node to create elements connecting them, as well as subdividing a coarse mesh by different amounts in each direction. After solving, a deformed view, animation, and exporting to a CSV file are available.

== Applications ==
- Cephalopod shells under hydrostatic pressure and bite forces.
- Technique for thermal transient nondestructive evaluation of plates.
- Comparison between goat skin and X-ray film for natural frequencies of a drum membrane.
- 3D electrostatic potential for scanning tunneling microscopy-induced luminescence.

== Benchmarks ==
For a thin shell wall in pure bending, Mecway's deflection and stress were found to have 2% and 6% deviation from the reference solution respectively, compared to 0.02% and 0.2% for ANSYS.

For an axisymmetric pressure vessel, the axial stress reported by Mecway had 0.2% deviation from the reference solution, compared to 0.03% for ANSYS.

For a thick-walled spherical pressure vessel, Mecway's radial and hoop stress at the internal surface were both found to have 1% deviation from the reference solution, compared to 0.05-0.1% for ANSYS.
