= Quickfield =

- Developer: Tera Analysis Ltd.
- Initial release: 1991
- Stable release: 7.0 / September 15, 2025
- Operating system: Windows
- Type: Finite element analysis
- License: Proprietary EULA

QuickField is a finite element analysis software package running on Windows platforms. It is developed by the Danish company Tera Analysis Ltd. in cooperation with Russian firm Tor Ltd. QuickField is available as a commercial program or as a free Student Edition with limited functionality. Main applications include computer simulations of electromagnetic fields for scientific and industrial purposes, and use as a teaching aid in the college and university electromagnetic or physics courses.

== Analysis types ==
- AC, DC and transient electromagnetics
- Electrostatics, DC, AC and transient electric analysis
- Steady-state and transient heat transfer
- Stress analysis
- Coupled multiphysics
