= VisualFEA =

- Screen shot of VisualFEA 5.0
- Developer: Intuition Software
- Release: January 2000
- Stable release: 5.11 / January 18, 2016
- Operating system: Windows, Mac OS X
- Type: Finite element analysis
- License: Proprietary

VisualFEA is a finite element analysis software program for Microsoft Windows and Mac OS X. It is developed and distributed by Intuition Software, Inc. of South Korea, and used chiefly for structural and geotechnical analysis. Its strongest point is its intuitive, user-friendly design based on graphical pre- and postprocessing capabilities. It has educational features for teaching and learning structural mechanics, and finite element analysis through graphical simulation. It is widely used in college-level courses related to structural mechanics and finite element methods.

== Overview ==
VisualFEA is a finite element analysis program with many tools. These tools can be classified into four general groups: finite element processing, pre-processing, post-processing and educational simulation. All the tools are integrated into a single toolbar module, a graphic design choice commonly used in simple programs. The pre-processing, analysis, and post-processing stages can be completed without needing to change programs, or without moving data from one program to another.

== Processing ==
VisualFEA can solve the following types of problems.

- Mechanical analysis

Truss, frame, plane stress, plane strain, axisymmetric, plate bending, shell and 3D solid
Linear, material nonlinear or geometric nonlinear analysis
Static or dynamic analysis
Construction staged analysis
Geotechnical analysis (consolidation, slope stability analysis)

- Heat conduction analysis

Plane, axisymmetric and 3D volume
Steady state or transient analysis
Linear or nonlinear material model
Fire damage analysis

- Seepage analysis

Plane, axisymmetric and 3D volume
Steady state or transient analysis
Confined or unconfined boundary condition

- Coupled analysis

Heat conduction coupled mechanical analysis
Seepage coupled mechanical analysis

== Pre-processing ==
A finite element model in VisualFEA consists of various objects: curve, primitive surface, node, element and mesh. VisualFEA has its own CAD-like capabilities of creating graphical objects without aid of external programs. VisualFEA can create structured or unstructured meshes in two- or three-dimensional space using the following mesh generation schemes.

- Mapping scheme (lofting, tri-mapping, transfinite mapping, isoparametric mapping)
- Sweeping scheme (extrusion, translation, rotation, twisting)
- Auto mesh scheme (triangulation, tetrahedronization)
- Mesh treatment (mesh carving, mesh operation, intersection, distortion)

The program has the function to save the generated mesh data in text format for use by other application programs. Other pre-processing capabilities include the following items.

- Definition and assignment of boundary conditions, material properties and element joints, etc.
- Node number or element number optimization
- Handling of element orientation, local coordinate axes

== Post-processing ==
VisualFEA has various functions of visualizing the numerical data generated by solving the analysis models. The most frequently used graphical representation of the data are the contour and vector images. There are many other forms of graphical representation available in VisualFEA.

- Iso-surface
- Sliced plane, parallel plane, cross plane
- Diagram (bending moment diagram, shear force diagram, etc.)
- Curve plotting
- Data probing
- Animation

== Educational Simulation ==
VisualFEA can be used as a tool for computer-aided education of structural mechanics and finite element method. The tools are operated with the user-created modeling data and their ensuing analysis results on the basis of finite element technology. They are devised to promote the understanding, and to stimulate the interest in the subjects by substantiating the conceptual principles and visually exhibiting the complex computational processes with the aid of interactive computer graphics. The topics covered by the educational functions are as follows.

- Mathematical relationships of internal forces in rigid frames.
- Geometric properties of an arbitrarily defined member section
- Stresses on the member sections
- Moving load
- Mohr circle and its application to elasto-plastic yielding.
- Stress path and yield surface
- Buckling
- Stiffness assembly and solution process in the finite element analysis.
- Shape function and interpolation
- Eigen value analysis.
- Concept of adaptive analysis

== VisualFEA/CBT ==
VisualFEA/CBT is an educational version of the program published by John Wiley and Son's Inc. as a companion program to a textbook on finite element method. The program has the limitation of 3000 nodes that can be handled.
