= JSOL =

JSOL Corporation
- Founded: July 2006
- Headquarters: Harumi Center Bldg. 2-5-24 Harumi, Chuo-ku, Tokyo 104-0053
- Key people: Masaya Onagi : President and CEO
- Total assets: 5 billion
- Number of employees: 1,300 (as of January, 2009)
- Parent: NTT Data 50%, The Japan Research Institute, Limited 50%
- Website: JSOL Corporation

The JSOL Corporation (株式会社JSOL, Kabushiki-gaisha JSOL), formally known as JRI Solutions, Limited, is a subsidiary of NTT Data and an equity method affiliate of the Sumitomo Mitsui Financial Group that acts as an IT consulting services corporation for general industries and public corporations.

== History ==
The Japan Research Institute, Limited under the Sumitomo Mitsui Financial Group originally established the JSOL Corporation as a wholly owned subsidiary called JRI-Solutions, Limited in July 2006.

On September 29, 2008, NTT Data, the Sumitomo Mitsui Financial Group, The Japan Research Institute, Limited, and JRI-Solutions, Limited established a broad-range capital and business alliance.

On January 1, 2009, JRI-Solutions, Limited became the subsidiary of NTT Data and the corporate name changed from JRI-Solutions to the JSOL Corporation.

== Services and products ==
The JSOL Corporation provides IT consulting, systems implementation, outsourcing, and develops and distributes various computer-aided engineering (CAE) software such as JMAG and LS-DYNA.

== Company locations ==
- Tokyo Head Office: Harumi Center Bldg. 2-5-24 Harumi, Chuo-ku, Tokyo 104-0053
  - Sangen-jaya Office
- Osaka Head Office：Tosabori Daibiru Bldg. 2-2-4 Tosabori, Nishi-ku, Osaka 550-0001
- Nagoya Regional Office

== See also ==
- NTT Data
- Sumitomo Mitsui Financial Group
