= Elmer FEM solver =

Scientific software

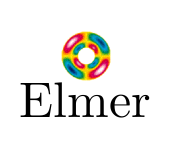

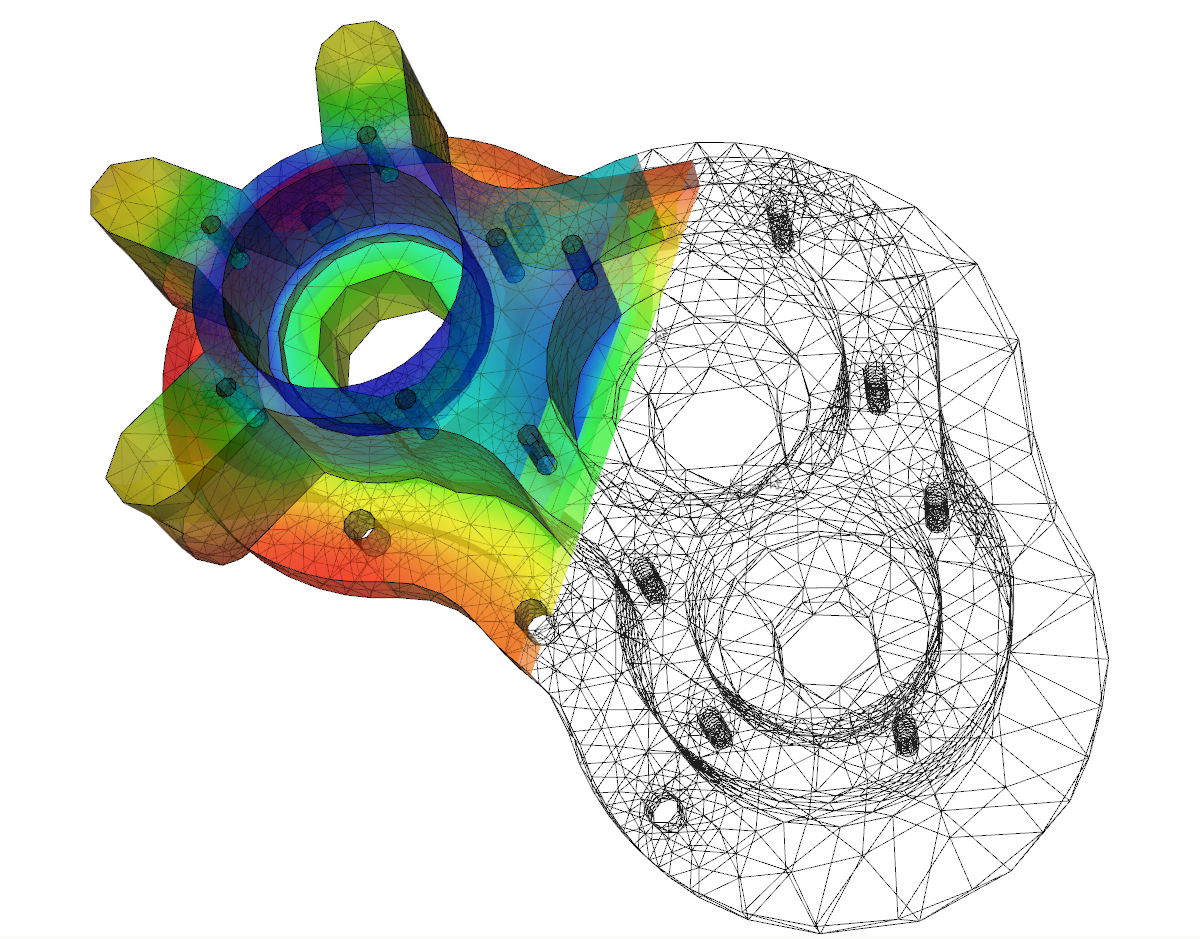
- One of the simpler examples provided with Elmer, a thermal model of a pump casing, as visualised using the ElmerPost tool
- Stable release: 26.2.1 / 29 April 2026
- Written in: Fortran 90, C and C++
- Operating system: Linux, Microsoft Windows, MacOS
- Platform: command line /GUI Qt v4/v5
- Type: CAE
- License: GNU General Public License
- Website: www.elmerfem.org
- Repository: github.com/ElmerCSC/elmerfem

Elmer is a computational tool for multi-physics problems. It was developed by CSC in collaboration with Finnish universities, research laboratories and industry. Elmer FEM solver is free and open-source software, subject to the requirements of the GNU General Public License (GPL), version 2 or any later.

Elmer includes physical models of fluid dynamics, structural mechanics, electromagnetics, heat transfer and acoustics. These are described by partial differential equations which Elmer solves by the Finite Element Method (FEM).

Elmer comprises several different parts:

- ElmerGrid – A mesh conversion tool, which can be used to convert differing mesh formats into Elmer-suitable meshes.
- ElmerGUI – A graphical interface which can be used on an existing mesh to assign physical models. This generates a "case file" which describes the problem to be solved. It does not show the entire functionality of ElmerSolver in GUI.
- ElmerSolver – The numerical solver which performs the finite element calculations, using the mesh and case files.
- ElmerPost – A post-processing/visualisation module. (Development stopped in favour of other post-processing tools such as ParaView, VisIt, etc.)

The parts of Elmer software may be used independently. Whilst the main module is the ElmerSolver tool - which includes many sophisticated features for physical model solving - additional components are required to create a full workflow. For pre- and post-processing: other tools, such as Paraview, can be used to visualise the output.

The software runs on Unix and Windows platforms and it can be compiled on a large variety of compilers using the CMake building tool. The solver can also be used in a multi-host parallel mode on platforms that support MPI.

== See also ==
- Finite Element Method
- List of finite element packages
