= Fluid–structure interaction =

Interaction of a structure with a fluid flow

Fluid–structure interaction (FSI) is the interaction of some movable or deformable structure with an internal or surrounding fluid flow. Fluid–structure interactions can be stable or oscillatory. In oscillatory interactions, the strain induced in the solid structure causes it to move such that the source of strain is reduced, and the structure returns to its former state only for the process to repeat.

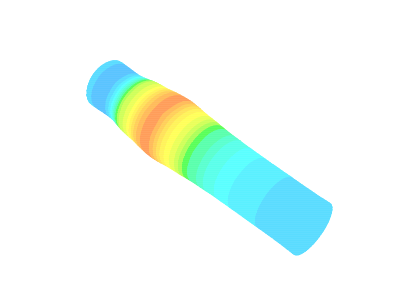
Propagation of a pressure wave through an incompressible fluid in a flexible tube

== Examples ==
Fluid–structure interactions are a crucial consideration in the design of many engineering systems, e.g. automobile, aircraft, spacecraft, engines and bridges. Failing to consider the effects of oscillatory interactions can be catastrophic, especially in structures comprising materials susceptible to fatigue. Tacoma Narrows Bridge (1940), the first Tacoma Narrows Bridge, is probably one of the most infamous examples of large-scale failure. Aircraft wings and turbine blades can break due to FSI oscillations. A reed actually produces sound because the system of equations governing its dynamics has oscillatory solutions. The dynamic of reed valves used in two strokes engines and compressors is governed by FSI. The act of "blowing a raspberry" is another such example. The interaction between tribological machine components, such as bearings and gears, and lubricant is also an example of FSI. The lubricant flows between the contacting solid components and causes elastic deformation in them during this process. Fluid–structure interactions also occur in moving containers, where liquid oscillations due to the container motion impose substantial magnitudes of forces and moments to the container structure that affect the stability of the container transport system in a highly adverse manner. Another prominent example is the start up of a rocket engine, e.g. Space Shuttle main engine (SSME), where FSI can lead to considerable unsteady side loads on the nozzle structure. In addition to pressure-driven effects, FSI can also have a large influence on surface temperatures on supersonic and hypersonic vehicles.

Fluid–structure interactions also play a major role in appropriate modeling of blood flow. Blood vessels act as compliant tubes that change size dynamically when there are changes to blood pressure and velocity of flow. Failure to take into account this property of blood vessels can lead to a significant overestimation of resulting wall shear stress (WSS). This effect is especially imperative to take into account when analyzing aneurysms. It has become common practice to use computational fluid dynamics to analyze patient specific models. The neck of an aneurysm is the most susceptible to changes in to WSS. If the aneurysmal wall becomes weak enough, it becomes at risk of rupturing when WSS becomes too high. FSI models contain an overall lower WSS compared to non-compliant models. This is significant because incorrect modeling of aneurysms could lead to doctors deciding to perform invasive surgery on patients who were not at a high risk of rupture. While FSI offers better analysis, it comes at a cost of highly increased computational time. Non-compliant models have a computational time of a few hours, while FSI models could take up to 7 days to finish running. This leads to FSI models to be most useful for preventative measures for aneurysms caught early, but unusable for emergency situations where the aneurysm may have already ruptured.

== Analysis ==
Fluid–structure interaction problems and multiphysics problems in general are often too complex to solve analytically and so they have to be analyzed by means of experiments or numerical simulation. Research in the fields of computational fluid dynamics and computational structural dynamics is still ongoing but the maturity of these fields enables numerical simulation of fluid-structure interaction. Two main approaches exist for the simulation of fluid–structure interaction problems:

- Monolithic approach: the equations governing the flow and the displacement of the structure are solved simultaneously, with a single solver
- Partitioned approach: the equations governing the flow and the displacement of the structure are solved separately, with two distinct solvers

The monolithic approach requires a code developed for this particular combination of physical problems whereas the partitioned approach preserves software modularity because an existing flow solver and structural solver are coupled. Moreover, the partitioned approach facilitates solution of the flow equations and the structural equations with different, possibly more efficient techniques which have been developed specifically for either flow equations or structural equations. On the other hand, development of stable and accurate coupling algorithm is required in partitioned simulations. In conclusion, the partitioned approach allows reusing existing software which is an attractive advantage. However, stability of the coupling method needs to be taken into consideration. This is especially difficult, if the mass of the moving structure is small in comparison to the mass of fluid which is displaced by the structure movement.

In addition, the treatment of meshes introduces other classifications of FSI analysis. For example，one can classify them as the conforming mesh methods and the non-conforming mesh methods. Other classifications can be mesh-based methods and meshless methods.

== Numerical simulation ==
The Newton–Raphson method or a different fixed-point iteration can be used to solve FSI problems. Methods based on Newton–Raphson iteration are used in both the monolithic and the partitioned approach. These methods solve the nonlinear flow equations and the structural equations in the entire fluid and solid domain with the Newton–Raphson method. The system of linear equations within the Newton–Raphson iteration can be solved without knowledge of the Jacobian with a matrix-free iterative method, using a finite difference approximation of the Jacobian-vector product.

Whereas Newton–Raphson methods solve the flow and structural problem for the state in the entire fluid and solid domain, it is also possible to reformulate an FSI problem as a system with only the degrees of freedom in the interface's position as unknowns. This domain decomposition condenses the error of the FSI problem into a subspace related to the interface. The FSI problem can hence be written as either a root finding problem or a fixed point problem, with the interface's position as unknowns.

Interface Newton–Raphson methods solve this root-finding problem with Newton–Raphson iterations, e.g. with an approximation of the Jacobian from a linear reduced-physics model. The interface quasi-Newton method with approximation for the inverse of the Jacobian from a least-squares model couples a black-box flow solver and structural solver by means of the information that has been gathered during the coupling iterations. This technique is based on the interface block quasi-Newton technique with an approximation for the Jacobians from least-squares models which reformulates the FSI problem as a system of equations with both the interface's position and the stress distribution on the interface as unknowns. This system is solved with block quasi-Newton iterations of the Gauss–Seidel type and the Jacobians of the flow solver and structural solver are approximated by means of least-squares models.

The fixed-point problem can be solved with fixed-point iterations, also called (block) Gauss–Seidel iterations, which means that the flow problem and structural problem are solved successively until the change is smaller than the convergence criterion. However, the iterations converge slowly if at all, especially when the interaction between the fluid and the structure is strong due to a high fluid/structure density ratio or the incompressibility of the fluid. The convergence of the fixed point iterations can be stabilized and accelerated by Aitken relaxation and steepest descent relaxation, which adapt the relaxation factor in each iteration based on the previous iterations.

If the interaction between the fluid and the structure is weak, only one fixed-point iteration is required within each time step. These so-called staggered or loosely coupled methods do not enforce the equilibrium on the fluid–structure interface within a time step but they are suitable for the simulation of aeroelasticity with a heavy and rather stiff structure. Several studies have analyzed the stability of partitioned algorithms for the simulation of fluid-structure interaction .

== See also ==
- Immersed boundary method
- Smoothed particle hydrodynamics
- Stochastic Eulerian Lagrangian method
- Computational fluid dynamics
- Fictitious domain method
- Fluid mechanics, fluid dynamics
- Structural mechanics, structural dynamics
- CFD Online page about FSI
- NASA page about a tail flutter test
- YouTube movie about flutter of glider wings
- Hydroelasticity
- Slosh dynamics

== Open source codes ==
- solids4Foam, a toolbox for OpenFOAM with capabilities for solid mechanics and fluid solid interactions
- oomph-lib
- Elmer FSI page
- CBC.solve Biomedical Solvers
- preCICE (software)
- SPHinXsys multi-physics library It provides C++ APIs for physical accurate simulation and aims to model coupled industrial dynamic systems including fluid, solid, multi-body dynamics and beyond with SPH (smoothed particle hydrodynamics), a meshless computational method using particle discretization.

== Academic Codes ==
- Stochastic Immersed Boundary Methods in 3D, P. Atzberger, UCSB
- Immersed Boundary Method for Adaptive Meshes in 3D, B. Griffith, NYU.
- Immersed Boundary Method for Uniform Meshes in 2D, A. Fogelson, Utah
- IFLS, IFL, TU Braunschweig

== Commercial Codes ==
- Abaqus Multiphysics Coupling
- AcuSolve FSI applications
- ADINA FSI homepage
- Ansys' FSI homepage
- Altair RADIOSS
- Autodesk Simulation CFD
- Simcenter STAR-CCM+ from Siemens Digital Industries Software
- CoLyX - FSI and mesh-morphing from EVEN - Evolutionary Engineering AG
- Fluidyn-MP FSI Multiphysics Coupling
- COMSOL FSI homepage
- MpCCI homepage
- MSC Software MD Nastran
- MSC Software Dytran
- FINE/Oofelie FSI: Fully integrated and strongly coupled for better convergence
- LS-DYNA Home Page
- Fluidyn-MP FSI: Fluid-Structure Interaction
- CompassFEM Tdyn
- CompassFEM SeaFEM
- Cradle SC/Tetra CFD Software
- PARACHUTES FSI HomePage
