= FEBio =

- Developers: Musculoskeletal Research Laboratories (University of Utah) and Musculoskeletal Biomechanics Laboratory (Columbia University)
- Stable release: 4.3 / August 2023
- Operating system: Linux, Mac OS X, Windows
- Type: Technical computing
- License: MIT
- Website: https://febio.org/

FEBio(Finite Elements for Biomechanics) is a software package for finite element analysis and was specifically designed for applications in biomechanics and bioengineering. It was developed in collaboration with research groups from the University of Utah (MRL, SCI) and Columbia University (MBL).

FEBio offers modeling scenarios, constitutive models, and boundary conditions that are relevant to numerous research areas and specializes in the analysis of 3D multiphysics models that can undergo large deformations. Users can solve problems in solid mechanics, contact analysis, porous media problems, fluid mechanics, and as of version 2.8, fluid-solid interaction (FSI) problems as well. FEBio supports both quasi-static and dynamic analyses. A more detailed overview of FEBio's features follows below.

The source code for FEBio is publicly available and, as of version 2.9, distributed under the MIT License. Older versions are available under a custom license and are not considered Open-source software because they are only free for non-commercial use.

The source code is available on GitHub ()

FEBio supports a plugin framework that allows users to easily extend and customize the set of features for their specific needs. Using this plugin framework users can develop new constitutive models, boundary conditions, body loads, nonlinear constraints, and even new finite element solvers (see e.g. the FEBioChem plugin, which implements a reaction-diffusion solver for solving chemical reactions in mixtures ).

== Overview ==
A brief overview of the available features (as of version 2.8) follows. A more complete list can be found in the FEBio User's manuals .

- Solid Mechanics
  - Non-linear (quasi-) static, non-linear dynamic, energy conserving time integration schemes
  - Hyperelastic materials (isotropic, transversely-isotropic, anisotropic), visco-hyperelastic materials, damage models, fiber materials.
  - Rigid body mechanics and rigid-deformable coupling.
  - Prescribed displacements, surface loads (e.g. pressure, traction), and body loads.
  - Multiple tied and sliding contact formulations with or without friction.
  - Solid 3D linear and quadratic elements (tetrahedral, hexahedral, pentahedral).
  - Linear and quadratic shell elements that can be free, or placed on top or between solid elements.
- Multiphasic mechanics
  - Biphasic, biphasic-solute, triphasic (two solutes), and multiphasic materials with multiple solutes.
  - Steady-state or transient analysis conditions.
  - Special contact formulations that take solvent and/or solute flow across contact interface into account.
  - Solid-bound molecules that deform with the solid phase.
  - Chemical reactions between solutes/solid-bound molecules.
  - Specialized shell formulations for biphasic/multiphasic analyses.
- Fluid mechanics
  - Steady-state and transient fluid dynamic analysis.
  - Viscous fluid flow (Newtonian, Carreau, Carreau-Yasuda, Powell-Eyring, Cross).
  - Flow stabilization algorithms.
  - Fluid-solid interaction (FSI)
- Heat Transfer
  - Steady-state and transient linear heat transfer analysis.
  - Isotropic Fourier material.
  - Prescribed and initial temperature boundary condition, heat flux and convective heat flux, heat source.

== FEBio Studio ==
FEBio is a command-line application that only implements the solver algorithms. To assist with setting up FEBio models and analyzing the results, the FEBio Studio software was developed.

FEBio Studio is the newest development platform for creating, running, and analyzing FEBio models. It allows users to import geometry and meshes from various file formats, including some CAD formats (BREP, STEP) and offers some tet mesh generation capabilities. Users can then set up boundary, loading, and contact conditions, and define material and analysis parameters. The models can be run with FEBio directly from the FEBio Studio interface, or exported to the xml-formatted FEBio input file. Models can be run locally or send to a remote server. After FEBio completes, the results can be loaded directly into FEBio Studio for visualization and analysis.

FEBio Studio also provides access to an online model repository, which offers example models, models used in the FEBio Studio Webinars, and models shared by the FEBio community.

== Legacy tools ==
Prior to FEBio Studio, users used the PreView software to set up FEBio models and PostView for visualization and analysis. Since FEBio Studio combines these two software packages, in addition to providing many more features, the PreView and PostView software are considered obsolete.

PreView and PostView are no longer under active development since they are replaced by FEBioStudio. Users that still use these software packages are encouraged to switch to FEBio Studio.

== Support ==
Support for FEBio comes in various forms. A Theory manual and User manual are provided as part of the installation and are available online as well . Users can also ask questions on the FEBio User forums , and can report bugs and make new feature requests on the GitHub page.
