= Trilinos =

- Developer: Sandia National Laboratories
- Stable release: 16.1.0 / March 20, 2025; 17 months ago
- Available in: C++ and C
- License: Modified BSD license, GNU Lesser General Public License
- Website: trilinos.github.io
- Repository: github.com/trilinos/Trilinos

Trilinos is a collection of open-source software libraries, called packages, intended to be used as building blocks for the development of scientific applications. The word "Trilinos" is Greek and conveys the idea of "a string of pearls", suggesting a number of software packages linked together by a common infrastructure. Trilinos was developed at Sandia National Laboratories from a core group of existing algorithms and utilizes the functionality of software interfaces such as BLAS, LAPACK, and MPI. In 2004, Trilinos received an R&D100 Award.

Several supercomputing facilities provide an installed version of Trilinos for their users. These include the National Energy Research Scientific Computing Center (NERSC), Blue Waters at the National Center for Supercomputing Applications, and the Titan supercomputer at Oak Ridge National Laboratory.

== Features ==
Trilinos contains packages for:

- Constructing and using sparse graphs and matrices, and dense matrices and vectors.
- Iterative and direct solution of linear systems.
- Parallel multilevel and algebraic preconditioning.
- Solution of non-linear, eigenvalue and time-dependent problems.
- PDE-constrained optimization problems.
- Partitioning and load balancing of distributed data structures.
- Automatic differentiation
- Discretizing partial differential equations.

Trilinos supports distributed-memory parallel computation through the Message Passing Interface (MPI). In addition, some Trilinos packages have growing support for shared-memory parallel computation. They do so by means of the Kokkos package, which provides a common C++ interface over various parallel programming models, including OpenMP, POSIX Threads, and CUDA.

== Programming languages ==
Most Trilinos packages are written in C++. Trilinos version 12.0 and later requires C++11 support. Some Trilinos packages, like ML and Zoltan, are written in C. A few packages, like Epetra, have optional implementations of some computational kernels in Fortran, but Fortran is not required to build these packages.

Some Trilinos packages have bindings for other programming languages. These include Python, C, Fortran, and MATLAB.

== Software licenses ==
Each Trilinos package may have its own software license. Most packages are Open-source; most of these have a Modified BSD license, while a few packages are under the GNU Lesser General Public License (LGPL). The BLAS and LAPACK libraries are required dependencies.

== See also ==
- BLAS
- LAPACK
- Message Passing Interface
- List of numerical-analysis software
- List of open-source mathematical libraries
- Sandia National Laboratories
