= Gmsh =

Finite-element mesh generator

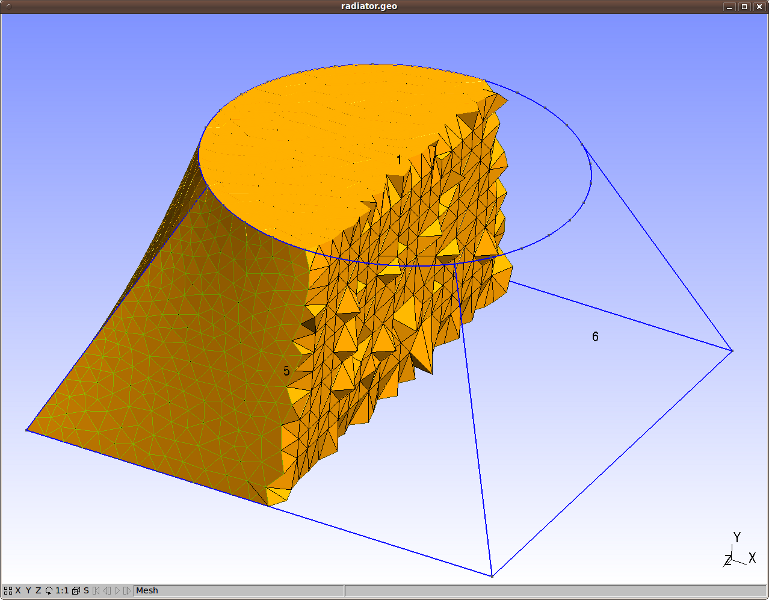
- Clipped view of Tetrahedral mesh; generated and viewed in Gmsh 2.3.1
- Developers: Christophe Geuzaine and Jean-François Remacle
- Stable release: 4.15.0 / October 26, 2025; 3 months ago
- Written in: C++
- Operating system: Unix/Linux, macOS, Windows
- License: GNU General Public License
- Website: gmsh.info
- Repository: gitlab.onelab.info/gmsh/gmsh

Gmsh is a finite-element mesh generator developed by Christophe Geuzaine and Jean-François Remacle. Released under the GNU General Public License, Gmsh is free software.

Gmsh contains 5 modules: for geometry description, meshing, solving and post-processing. Gmsh supports parametric input and has advanced visualization mechanisms. Since version 3.0, Gmsh supports full constructive solid geometry features, based on Open Cascade Technology.

A modified version of Gmsh is integrated with SwiftComp, a general-purpose multiscale modeling software. The modified version, called Gmsh4SC, is compiled and deployed on the Composites Design and Manufacturing HUB (cdmHUB).

== Interfaces ==
Various graphical user interfaces exist that integrate Gmsh into their workflow:

- A Matlab interface available with FEATool Multiphysics.
- The Mesh and FEM Workbenches of FreeCAD support Gmsh for meshing inside the program, along with other meshers like Netgen.

== See also ==
- TetGen
- Salome (software)
