= Multiphysics simulation =

Simulation of multiple aspects of physics

In computational modelling, multiphysics simulation (often shortened to simply "multiphysics") is defined as the simultaneous simulation of different aspects of a physical system or systems and the interactions among them. For example, simultaneous simulation of the physical stress on an object, the temperature distribution of the object and the thermal expansion which leads to the variation of the stress and temperature distributions would be considered a multiphysics simulation. Multiphysics simulation is related to multiscale simulation, which is the simultaneous simulation of a single process on either multiple time or distance scales.

As an interdisciplinary field, multiphysics simulation can span many science and engineering disciplines. Simulation methods frequently include numerical analysis, partial differential equations and tensor analysis.

== Multiphysics simulation process ==
The implementation of a multiphysics simulation follows a typical series of steps:

- Identify the aspects of the system to be simulated, including physical processes, starting conditions, and the coupling or boundary conditions among these processes.
- Create a discrete mathematical model of the system.
- Numerically solve the model.
- Process the resulting data.

== Mathematical models ==
Mathematical models used in multiphysics simulations are generally a set of coupled equations. The equations can be divided into three categories according to the nature and intended role: governing equation, auxiliary equations and boundary/initial conditions. A governing equation describes a major physical mechanism or process. Multiphysics simulations are numerically implemented with discretization methods such as the finite element method, finite difference method, or finite volume method.

== Software ==
Multiphysics simulations can be performed inside one code framework (software-wise monolithic approach application), or by coupling independent codes that each computes part of the solution of a multi-physics problem (software-wise partitioned approach).

Examples of simulation software targeting multi-physics simulations are OpenFOAM, COMSOL Multiphysics, the MOOSE framework, and more. Examples of coupling tools include preCICE, the Multiscale Universal Interface (MUI), OpenPALM (CWIPI), and MpCCI.

== Challenges of multiphysics simulation ==
Generally speaking, multiphysics simulation is much harder than that for individual aspects of the physical processes. The main extra issue is how to integrate the multiple aspects of the processes with proper handling of the interactions among them. Such issues become quite difficult when different types of numerical methods are used for the simulations of individual physical aspects. For example, when simulating a fluid-structure interaction problem with typical Eulerian finite volume method for flow and Lagrangian finite element method for structure dynamics.

== See also ==
- Finite difference time-domain method
- List of computer-aided engineering software
