= List of computational physics software =

This is a list of computational physics software which includes programs used to model, simulate, and analyze physical systems across electromagnetics, fluid dynamics, astrophysics, particle physics, and Monte Carlo simulations.

== Computational electromagnetics ==
Software	Description	License
ADDA	Discrete-dipole-approximation solver for electromagnetic scattering by finite 3D objects of arbitrary shape and composition	Open-source
Ansys HFSS	High-frequency EM simulation	Commercial
Ansys Lumerical	FDTD and eigenmode electromagnetic simulation for photonics	Commercial
AWR Analyst	3D antennas, waveguides, filters, PCBs	Commercial
AWR Axiem	PCBs, multi-layer PCBs, LTCC, on-chip passives	Commercial
COMSOL Multiphysics	FEM-based multiphysics and electromagnetic simulation	Commercial
CST Studio Suite	3D electromagnetic simulation	Commercial
DDSCAT	Discrete-dipole-approximation solver for electromagnetic scattering and absorption by irregular particles and periodic arrays	Open-source
FEKO	Antenna design and EM scattering	Commercial
JCMsuite	FEM solver for nano- and micro-photonic applications	Commercial
MAN	Quasinormal-mode analysis of electromagnetic resonators, including mode computation, normalization and reconstruction of optical responses	Open-source
Meep	Finite-difference time-domain electromagnetic solver	Open-source
MNPBEM	Boundary-element-method toolbox for electromagnetic simulations of plasmonic nanoparticles	Open-source
Momentum	MoM-based planar EM simulation in Keysight ADS	Commercial
MPB	Frequency-domain eigensolver for electromagnetic modes and photonic band structures in periodic media	Open-source
Numerical Electromagnetics Code and NEC2++	Antenna and EM scattering simulation	Open-source
ONELAB Photonics	FEM based on GetDP and Gmsh, including scattering and eigenmode calculations	Open-source
openEMS	Equivalent-circuit finite-difference time-domain electromagnetic solver	Open-source
PSSFSS	Periodic moment method solver for printed metasurface, polarization selective surface, and frequency selective surface unit cells	Open-source
pyGDM	Green-dyadic-method toolkit for full-field simulations of nanophotonic structures	Open-source
Quickfield	FEM solver for research, education, AC/DC/Transient	Commercial
S4	RCWA/Fourier-modal electromagnetic solver for layered periodic structures	Open-source
SMUTHI	Electromagnetic scattering by multiple particles in layered media using the T-matrix method	Open-source
treams	T-matrix-based electromagnetic scattering for finite and periodic particle arrangements and layered media.	Open-source
VSimEM	FDTD/PIC/finite-volume EM simulation	Commercial
XFdtd	3D full-wave electromagnetic solver	Commercial

== Computational fluid dynamics ==
Software	Description	License
ADCIRC	Coastal and ocean circulation model	Open-source
Ansys Fluids	Comprehensive CFD suite	Commercial
Autodesk Simulation	CFD and thermal simulation for engineering design	Commercial
CalculiX	Structural and thermal finite-element analysis	Open-source
CFD-ACE+	General-purpose CFD and multiphysics solver	Commercial
CFD-FASTRAN	CFD solver for aerodynamics and turbomachinery	Commercial
CGNS	CFD data standard and library	Open-source
CICE	Sea ice and ocean–ice interaction model	Open-source
Code Saturne	General-purpose CFD solver	Open-source
COMSOL Multiphysics	Commercial multiphysics + CFD suite	Commercial
Coolfluid	CFD framework for multiphysics	Open-source
Elmer FEM solver	Multiphysics FEM solver	Open-source
FEATool Multiphysics	PDE modeling, FEM, FVM, multiphysics	Open-source
FEniCS Project	Automated FEM library	Open-source
FLOW-3D	Free-surface and multiphase CFD	Commercial
Gerris	Adaptive mesh CFD solver	Open-source
KIVA	Internal combustion CFD	Open-source
MFEM	Finite-element discretization library	Open-source
MOOSE	Multiphysics FEM framework	Open-source
Nek5000	Spectral element CFD solver	Open-source
Nektar++	High-order spectral/hp element CFD	Open-source
OpenFOAM	Widely used open-source CFD suite	Open-source
OpenLB	Lattice Boltzmann CFD library	Open-source
RELAP5-3D	Reactor thermal–hydraulics system model	Open-source
Simcenter STAR-CCM+	Multiphysics CFD solver	Commercial
SU2 code	Multiphysics PDE + CFD solver	Open-source
TELEMAC	Hydrodynamics and sediment transport	Open-source

== Computational particle physics ==
Software	Description	License
APFEL	Parton distribution function evolution tool	Open-source
CompHEP	Symbolic computation for particle collisions	Open-source
CORSIKA	Cosmic-ray air shower simulation	Open-source
FLUKA	Particle transport and interaction simulation	Commercial
GEANT-3	Detector simulation (legacy)	Commercial
GEANT-4	Toolkit for simulating particle interactions in detectors	Open-source
PYTHIA	Event generator for high-energy collisions	Open-source
ROOT	Data analysis and visualization framework for high-energy physics	Open-source
UrQMD	Ultra-relativistic quantum molecular dynamics simulator	Open-source

== Computational astrophysics ==
Software	Description	License
Astropy	Python astronomy and astrophysics library	Open-source
Community Earth System Model	Earth system climate model	Open-source
GADGET	N-body + SPH cosmology simulations	Open-source
GMAT	Spacecraft trajectory and mission design	Open-source
FreeFlyer	Orbital mechanics and mission analysis	Commercial
MRAMS	Mars atmosphere and weather simulation	Open-source
Solarsoft	Solar and astrophysics data analysis	Open-source
Systems Tool Kit	Aerospace + orbital modeling suite	Commercial
TARDIS	Radiation transport for supernovae (astroparticle aligned)	Open-source

== Monte Carlo simulation ==
Software	Description	License
CASINO	Variational Monte Carlo and diffusion Monte Carlo	Open-Source
EGS	Particle transport Monte Carlo system	Open-source
GEF	Simulation of fission events.	Open-source
MCNP	Monte Carlo N-Particle Transport Code (nuclear engineering)	Commercial
MCSim	Statistical modeling and Monte Carlo	Open-source
McStas	Neutron instrument simulations	Open-source
McXtrace	X-ray instrument simulations	Open-source
MPMC	Hard-sphere Monte Carlo	Open-source
OpenMC	Neutron transport Monte Carlo	Open-source

== Others ==
Software	Domain	License
Algodoo	2D educational physics sandbox	Commercial
Avizo	3D visualization + simulation	Commercial
CP2K	Quantum chemistry / atomistic simulation	Open-source
EPICS	Control-system middleware	Open-source
EXC code	Nuclear structure / excitation modeling	Commercial
FASTRAD	Radiation shielding engineering	Commercial
FDMNES	X-ray absorption/emission simulation	Commercial
FEBio	Finite-element solver for biomechanics and soft tissue mechanics	Open-source
GYRO	Plasma turbulence (fusion research)	Commercial
HRS Computing	General HEP data/analysis platform	Commercial
Imc FAMOS	Instrument data acquisition / data analysis	Commercial
LISE++	Nuclear reactions / fragment separator simulation	Commercial
MELCOR	Nuclear reactor severe accident modeling	Commercial
Model for Prediction Across Scales	Multiscale multiphysics simulation	Commercial
OpenSees	Structural and earthquake engineering simulations, nonlinear dynamics	Open-source
Regional Atmospheric Modeling System	Atmospheric and weather transport modeling	Commercial
REFPROP	Thermophysical property calculations	Commercial
Scigress	Computational chemistry / molecular modeling	Commercial
Serpent	Reactor physics Monte Carlo (neutrons)	Commercial
Speakeasy	Numerical computing environment	Commercial
Spinach	Quantum spin dynamics	Open-source
SINDA	Thermal–fluid differential equation solver	Commercial
TALYS	Nuclear reaction software	Open-source
TRACE	Nuclear reactor thermal-hydraulics	Commercial
Surface Evolver	Surface and interface shape simulation	Open-source

== See also ==
- High-performance computing
- List of computational chemistry software
- List of computer simulation software
- List of computer physics engines and List of open-source physics engines
- List of computational materials science software
- List of computational physics journals
- List of computer-aided engineering software
- List of finite element software packages
- List of mathematical software
- List of physicists
- List of plasma physics software
- List of quantum chemistry and solid-state physics software
- List of software for astronomy research and education
- List of software for nanostructures modeling
- List of software for nuclear engineering
- Multiphysics simulation
