= List of computational fluid dynamics software =

This is a list of computational fluid dynamics software — including multiphysics simulation, finite-element, finite-volume, finite difference, boundary element, riemann solver, dissipative particle dynamics, smoothed particle hydrodynamics, direct numerical simulation, turbulence modeling, aerodynamic potential-flow code, thermal hydraulics, lattice Boltzmann methods and more.

== Table ==
List of computational fluid dynamics software
Name	Developer / Organization	License	Notes
ADCIRC	University of North Carolina & USACE	Open-source	Coastal circulation and storm surge modeling
ADINA	ADINA R&D, Inc.	Commercial	Multiphysics FEM, includes CFD
Advanced Simulation Library	Avtech Scientific	Open-source	GPU-accelerated multiphysics simulations
Autodesk Simulation	Autodesk	Commercial	Multiphysics and CFD software, includes structural and thermal analysis
CalculiX	Open-source community	Open-source	Finite element solver with CFD capabilities
CATHARE	CEA (France)	Commercial	Thermal-hydraulic simulation for nuclear reactors
CFD-ACE+	Applied Materials Inc.	Commercial	Multiphysics CFD software for fluid flow, heat transfer, and chemical reactions in engineering applications
CFD-FASTRAN	NASA	Commercial	Aerodynamics and aerospace CFD
CFD General Notation System (CGNS)	NASA	Open-source	CFD data standard library
code_saturne	EDF R&D	Open-source	General-purpose CFD solver
COMSOL Multiphysics	COMSOL	Commercial	Multiphysics solver with CFD capabilities, including laminar and turbulent flow, heat transfer, and fluid-structure interaction
CONVERGE CFD	Convergent Science	Commercial	Automatic meshing CFD software for engines and complex flows
Coolfluid	Open-source community	Open-source	Modular multiphysics framework
Elmer FEM solver	CSC – IT Center for Science (Finland)	Open-source	Multiphysics finite element solver including CFD, structural, heat transfer, and electromagnetics
FEATool Multiphysics	Precise Simulation	Commercial	GUI-driven multiphysics, includes CFD
FEniCS Project	FEniCS Project community	Open-source	Finite element library for solving PDEs, including CFD, heat transfer, and other multiphysics problems
FLACS	GexCon	Commercial	CFD for industrial explosions and safety
FLOW-3D	Flow Science, Inc.	Commercial	Free surface flow CFD solver for multiphysics simulations
Gerris	Open-source community	Open-source	Adaptive CFD solver for fluid dynamics
KIVA	Los Alamos National Laboratory	Open-source	Engine combustion CFD
MFEM	Lawrence Livermore National Laboratory	Open-source	Finite element library for high-performance multiphysics, including CFD
MOOSE	Idaho National Laboratory	Open-source	Multiphysics finite element framework
Nek5000	Argonne National Laboratory	Open-source	Spectral element CFD solver
Nektar++	Open-source community	Open-source	High-order spectral/hp element CFD
OpenFOAM	OpenFOAM Foundation	Open-source	General-purpose CFD solver
OpenLB	Open-source community	Open-source	Lattice Boltzmann CFD solver
openTELEMAC	openTELEMAC-Mascaret consortium	Open-source	Hydrodynamics and free-surface flow CFD
OVERFLOW	NASA	Proprietary	Overset-grid CFD solver for aerodynamic analysis of aircraft and spacecraft
PowerFLOW	Dassault Systèmes	Commercial	Lattice Boltzmann high-fidelity CFD solver to simulate complex fluid flows such as aerodynamics, aeroacoustics, multiphase and thermal effects.
Pumplinx	XRG Simulation GmbH	Commercial	HVAC and building CFD
QBlade	QBlade community	GPL	Wind turbine aerodynamic simulation and CFD-based rotor analysis for wind turbine design
RELAP5-3D	Idaho National Laboratory	Open-source	Thermal-hydraulic and nuclear reactor CFD
SU2 code	Stanford University	Open-source	Aerodynamics and CFD research framework
Simcenter Flomaster	Siemens	Commercial	1D thermo-fluid systems simulation, transient solver, pressure surge, system-level fluid modeling
Simcenter STAR-CCM+	Siemens	Commercial	Multiphysics CFD and engineering simulations
SimScale	SimScale GmbH	Commercial	Cloud-based CFD and FEA platform for engineering simulations
SimulationX	ITI GmbH	Commercial	Model-based simulation software for multi-domain systems, including thermo-fluid, mechanical, electrical, and control systems
Tecplot	Tecplot, Inc.	Commercial	CFD visualization and analysis
WindSim	WindSim AS	Commercial	CFD software for wind flow over complex terrain and wind farm design
XFlow	Dassault Systèmes	Commercial	Particle-based CFD solver for complex, free-surface and transient flows

== See also ==
- Ansys
- CFD in buildings
- Combustion models for CFD
- Computational fluid dynamics
- List of computational physics software
- Lists of engineering software
- List of finite element software packages
- List of numerical analysis software
- List of plasma physics software
- List of computer simulation software
- RWDI
