= Nektar++ =

- Release: 4 May 2006; 20 years ago
- Stable release: 5.10.0 / 4 July 2026; 58 days ago
- Written in: C++
- Operating system: Unix/Linux/OS X/Windows,
- Type: Spectral element method, Hp-FEM, Computational fluid dynamics,
- License: MIT License,
- Website: http://www.nektar.info

Nektar++ is a spectral/hp element framework designed to support the construction of efficient high-performance scalable solvers for a wide range of partial differential equations (PDE). The code is released as open-source under the MIT license. Although primarily driven by application-based research, it has been designed as a platform to support the development of novel numerical techniques in the area of high-order finite element methods.

Nektar++ is modern object-oriented code written in C++ and is being actively developed by members of the SherwinLab at Imperial College London (UK) and Kirby's group at the University of Utah (US).

== Capabilities ==
Nektar++ includes the following capabilities:

- One-, two- and three-dimensional problems;
- Multiple and mixed element types, i.e. triangles, quadrilaterals, tetrahedra, prisms and hexahedra;
- Both hierarchical and nodal expansion bases with variable and heterogeneous polynomial order between elements;
- Continuous Galerkin, discontinuous Galerkin, hybridizable discontinuous Galerkin and flux reconstruction operators;
- Multiple implementations of finite element operators for efficient execution on a wide range of CPU architectures;
- Comprehensive range of explicit, implicit and implicit-explicit (IMEX) time-integration schemes;
- Preconditioners tailored to high-order finite element methods;
- Numerical stabilization techniques such as dealiasing and spectral vanishing viscosity;
- Parallel execution and scalable to thousands of processor cores;
- Pre-processing tools to generate meshes, or manipulate and convert meshes generated with third-party software into a Nektar++-readable format;
- Extensive post-processing capabilities for manipulating output data;
- Cross platform support for Linux, Mac OS X and Windows;
- Support for running jobs on cloud computing platforms via the prototype Nekkloud interface from the libhpc project;
- Wide user community, support and annual workshop.

Stable versions of the software are released on a 1-month basis and it is supported by an extensive testing framework which ensures correctness across a range of platforms and architectures.

Other capabilities currently under active development include p-adaption, r-adaption and support for accelerators (GPGPU, Intel Xeon Phi).

== Application domains ==
The development of the Nektar++ framework is driven by a number of aerodynamics and biomedical engineering applications and consequently the software package includes a number of pre-written solvers for these areas.

=== Incompressible flow ===
This solver time-integrates the incompressible Navier-Stokes equations for performing large-scale direct numerical simulation (DNS) in complex geometries. It also supports the linearised and adjoint forms of the Navier-Stokes equations for evaluating hydrodynamic stability of flows.

=== Compressible flow ===
External aerodynamics simulations of high-speed compressible flows are supported through solution of the compressible Euler or Navier-Stokes equations.

=== Cardiac Electrophysiology ===
This solver supports the solution of the monodomain model and bidomain model of action potential propagation through myocardium.

=== Other application areas ===
- shallow water equations;
- reaction-diffusion-advection problems;
- pulse wave propagation solver for modelling arterial networks;
- acoustic perturbation equations;
- linear elasticity equations.

== License ==
Nektar++ is free and open source software, released under the MIT license.

== Alternative software ==
=== Free and open-source software ===
- Nek5000 (BSD)
- Advanced Simulation Library (AGPL)
- Code Saturne (GPL)
- FEATool Multiphysics
- Gerris Flow Solver (GPL)
- OpenFOAM (GPL)
- SU2 code (LGPL)
- PyFR

=== Proprietary software ===
- ADINA CFD
- ANSYS CFX
- ANSYS Fluent
- COMSOL Multiphysics
- Pumplinx
- Simcenter STAR-CCM+
- KIVA (software)
- RELAP5-3D
