= Sinda =

Sinda may refer to:

- Sinda (Pamphylia), an ancient city, former bishopric and Roman Catholic titular see in Asian Turkey
- Sinda (Pisidia), an ancient town of Anatolia
- Sinda, Tibet, China
- Sinda District, Zambia
  - Sinda (constituency), a parliamentary constituency in Zambia
- Inner Sinda and Outer Sinda, two of the nine islands of the Dar es Salaam Marine Reserve in Tanzania
- Sinta, Cyprus
- Anapa, Russia, known as Sinda in antiquity

SINDA may refer to:

- Singapore Indian Development Association (SINDA)
- Systems Improved Numerical Differential Analyzer (SINDA), software to calculate thermal behaviour of spacecraft
