= CATHARE (software) =

CATHARE code thermal-hydraulics simulation software

- Developer: CEA
- Initial release: 1987
- Stable release: CATHARE-3 v3.0.0 / December 2023..
- Written in: C++ (version 3); Fortran (version 1 and 2)
- Operating system: Linux, Microsoft Windows
- Type: Computational fluid dynamics
- License: Proprietary
- Website: cathare.cea.fr

CATHARE (Code for Analysis of Thermalhydraulics during an Accident of Reactor and safety Evaluation) is a system-scale, two-phase thermal-hydraulics simulation software developed by CEA since 1979. The result of a partnership with EDF, Framatome and IRSN, it has historically been used for nuclear safety studies on pressurized water reactors, as well as in training simulators for the French nuclear fleet.

Its scope of use has gradually been extended to other nuclear industries, as well as to other sectors such as transport and space propulsion. The code is involved in most reactor design projects in the French nuclear sector, whether for Generation III power reactors (EPR, NUWARD), Generation IV reactors (sodium-cooled fast reactors, lead, gas, molten-salt reactors), research reactors (Jules Horowitz Reactor) or naval propulsion.

By default, CATHARE solves a six-equation system (conservation of mass, momentum and energy for the liquid and vapor phases), explicitly allowing for differences in velocity and temperature between phases. It features a modular multi-scale structure (0D, 1D, 3D), to adapt the discretization according to the components and type of study. The code also features numerous sub-modules, both hydraulic (pumps, valves, check valves, etc.) and thermal (fuel rods, heat exchangers, etc.). As a result, it can model transient scenarios of complex systems with computation times close to or even less than the physical time. This is particularly useful for modeling the primary circuits of nuclear reactors in accident situations, such as loss-of-coolant accident, which can last several hours or even days. Its latest major release, CATHARE-3, available to partners since the end of 2019, features several new functionalities. In 2020, it won the annual Grand Prix of the French Nuclear Energy Society

Simulations using the CATHARE-3 code were carried out as part of an international working group set up by the United Nations Environment Programme to assess methane emissions from leaking Nord Stream pipelines following their sabotage in September 2022. The results of the study are published in the journal Nature in January 2025

== See also ==
- List of computational fluid dynamics software
- Thermal-hydraulics
- Nuclear safety
- RELAP5-3D
