= FLACS =

- Developer: GexCon AS
- Stable release: 25.4
- Operating system: Microsoft Windows, Linux
- Type: Computational fluid dynamics software
- License: Proprietary software
- Website: www.flacs.com

FLACS is a commercial computational fluid dynamics (CFD) software used extensively for explosion modeling and atmospheric dispersion modeling within the field of industrial safety and risk assessment. Main application areas of FLACS are in petrochemical, process manufacturing, food processing, wood processing, metallurgical, and nuclear safety industries.

FLACS has dedicated modules to simulate gas explosion, dust explosion and explosions involving chemical explosives like TNT. FLACS is also extensively used to simulate flammable and toxic gas dispersion. It was applied in the investigation of many high profile accidents such as Buncefield fire, Piper Alpha, TWA Flight 800, and the Petrobras 36 platform.

== History ==
FLACS software development started in-house in the early 1980s under the sponsorship program, Gas Explosion Safety (GSP), funded by the oil companies BP, Elf Aquitaine, Esso, Mobil, Norsk Hydro and Statoil. FLACS-86 was released to GSP sponsors in 1986. Continuous research and development from then onwards resulted in many commercial releases. In 2006, FLACS v8.1 was released to customers. Till then FLACS was developed for Unix and Linux platforms. In 2008, however, FLACS v9.0 was released for Microsoft Windows platform. FLACS v9.1 and FLACS-Wind was developed in 2010. A fully parallelized FLACSv10.0 (using OpenMP) with a new solver for incompressible flows was released in 2012. FLACSv10.0 also constitutes a Homogeneous Equilibrium Model (HEM) for two-phase flow calculations.

== Related software ==
- CFX (proprietary software)
- Fire Dynamics Simulator (GPL)
- OpenFOAM (GPL)
- KFX (DNV)

== See also ==
- Atmospheric dispersion modeling
- Computer simulation
- List of computational fluid dynamics software
