= KIVA (software) =

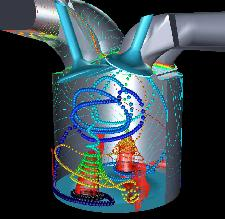
- KIVA simulation of an experimental engine with DOHC quasi-symmetric pent-roof combustion chamber and 4 valves.
- Developer: Los Alamos National Laboratory
- Release: 1985; 41 years ago
- Stable release: KIVA-4mpi / 2009; 17 years ago
- Written in: Fortran
- Operating system: Linux, Unix, Windows
- Type: Physics
- License: Proprietary
- Website: www.osti.gov/biblio/1177537

KIVA is a family of Fortran-based computational fluid dynamics software developed by Los Alamos National Laboratory (LANL). The software predicts complex fuel and air flows as well as ignition, combustion, and pollutant-formation processes in engines. The KIVA models have been used to understand combustion chemistry processes, such as auto-ignition of fuels, and to optimize diesel engines for high efficiency and low emissions. General Motors has used KIVA in the development of direct-injection, stratified charge gasoline engines as well as the fast burn, homogeneous-charge gasoline engine. Cummins reduced development time and cost by 10%–15% using KIVA to develop its high-efficiency 2007 ISB 6.7-L diesel engine that was able to meet 2010 emission standards in 2007. At the same time, the company realized a more robust design and improved fuel economy while meeting all environmental and customer constraints.

== History ==
LANL's Computational Fluid Dynamics expertise hails from the very beginning of the Manhattan Project in the 1940s. When the United States found itself in the midst of the first energy crisis in the 1970s, this core Laboratory capability transformed into KIVA, an internal combustion engine modeling tool designed to help make automotive engines more fuel-efficient and cleaner-burning. A "kiva" is actually a round Pueblo ceremonial chamber that is set underground and entered from above by means of a ladder through its roof; drawing on LANL's southwestern heritage, an analogy is made with the typical engine cylinder in which the entrance and exit of gases is achieved through valves set in the cylinder.

The first public release of KIVA was made in 1985 through the National Energy Software Center (NESC) at Argonne National Laboratory, which served at the time as the official distribution hub for Department of Energy-sponsored software. Distribution of KIVA continued through the Energy Science and Technology Software Center (ESTSC) in Oak Ridge, Tennessee until 2008, when distribution of multiple versions of KIVA returned to LANL's Technology Transfer Division (TT). KIVA is used by hundreds of institutions worldwide, including the Big Three U.S. auto makers, Cummins, Caterpillar, and various federal laboratories.

== Overview ==
Fuel economy is heavily dependent upon engine efficiency, which in turn depends to a large degree on how fuel is burned within the cylinders of the engine. Higher in-cylinder pressures and temperatures lead to increased fuel economy, but they also create more difficulty in controlling the combustion process. Poorly controlled and incomplete combustion can cause higher levels of emissions and lower engine efficiencies.

In order to optimize combustion processes, engine designers have traditionally undertaken manual engine modifications, conducted testing, and analyzed the results. This iterative process is painstakingly slow, costly, and does not lend itself to identifying the optimal engine design specifications. In response to these problems, Los Alamos National Laboratory scientists developed KIVA, an advanced computational fluid dynamics (CFD) modeling code that accurately simulates the in-cylinder processes of engines.

KIVA, a transient, three-dimensional, multiphase, multicomponent code for the analysis of chemically reacting flows with sprays has been under development at LANL for decades. The code uses an Arbitrary Lagrangian Eulerian (ALE) methodology on a staggered grid, and discretizes space using the finite volume method. The code uses an implicit time-advancement with the exception of the advective terms that are cast in an explicit but second-order monotonicity-preserving manner. Also, the convection calculations can be subcycled in the desired regions to avoid restricting the time step due to Courant conditions.

KIVA's functionality extends from low speeds to supersonic flows for both laminar and turbulent regimes. Transport and chemical reactions for an arbitrary number of species and their chemical reactions is provided. A stochastic particle method is used to calculate evaporating liquid sprays, including the effects of droplet collisions, agglomeration, and aerodynamic breakups.

Although specifically designed for simulating internal combustion engines, the modularity of the code facilitates easy modifications for solving a variety of hydrodynamics problems involving chemical reactions. The versatility and range of features have made KIVA programs attractive to a variety of non-engine applications as well; these range from convection towers to modeling silicon dioxide condensation in high pressure oxidation chambers. Other applications have included the analysis of flows in automotive catalytic converters, power plant smokestack cleaning, pyrolytic treatment of biomass, design of fire suppression systems, Pulsed Detonation Engines (PDEs), stationary burners, aerosol dispersion, and design of heating, ventilation, and air conditioning systems. The code has found a widespread application in the automotive industry.

== Versions ==
=== KIVA-3V ===
Fuel impingement in an engine cylinder modeled with KIVA-3V.

KIVA-3V is the most mature version of KIVA still maintained and distributed through LANL; it is an improved version of the earlier Federal Laboratory Consortium Excellence in Technology Transfer Award-winning KIVA3 (1993), extended to model vertical or canted valves in the cylinder head of a gasoline or diesel engine. KIVA3, in turn, was based on the earlier KIVA2 (1989) and KIVA (1985), and used the same numerical solution procedure and solved the same types of equations.

KIVA-3V uses a block-structured mesh with connectivity defined through indirect addressing. The departure from a single rectangular structure in logical space allows complex geometries to be modeled with significantly greater efficiency because large regions of deactivated cells are no longer necessary. Cell-face boundary conditions permit greater flexibility and simplification in the application of boundary conditions. KIVA-3V also contains a number of significant improvements over its predecessors. New features enhanced the robustness, efficiency, and usefulness of the overall program for engine modeling. Automatic restart of the cycle with a reduced timestep in case of iteration limit or temperature overflow effectively reduced code crashes. A new option provided automatic deactivation of a port region when it is closed from the cylinder and reactivation when it communicates with the cylinder. Extensions to the particle-based liquid wall film model made the model more complete and a split injection option was also added. A new subroutine monitors the liquid and gaseous fuel phases and energy balance data and emissions are monitored and printed. In addition, new features were added to the LANL-developed grid generator, K3PREP, and the KIVA graphics post processor, K3POST.

=== KIVA-4 ===
KIVA-4 is maintained and distributed through LANL. While KIVA-4 maintains the full generality of KIVA-3V, it adds the capability of computing with unstructured grids. Unstructured grids can be generated more easily than structured grids for complex geometries. The unstructured grids may be composed of a variety of elements including hexahedra, prisms, pyramids, and tetrahedra. However, the numerical accuracy diminishes when the grid is not composed of hexahedra. KIVA-4 was developed to work with the many geometries accommodated within KIVA-3V, which includes 2D axisymmetric, 2D planar, 3D axisymmetric sector geometries, and full 3D geometries. KIVA-4 also features a multicomponent fuel evaporation algorithm. Many of the numerical algorithms in KIVA-3V generalize properly to unstructured meshes; however, fundamental changes were needed in the solution of the pressure equation and the fluxing of momentum. In addition, KIVA-4 loops over cell faces to compute diffusion terms.

=== KIVA-4mpi ===
Recently, LANL researchers developed KIVA-4mpi, a parallel version of KIVA-4, and the most advanced version of KIVA maintained and distributed by LANL. KIVA-4mpi also solves chemically reacting, turbulent, multi-phase viscous flows, but does this on multiple computer processors with a distributed computational domain (grid). KIVA-4mpi internal combustion engine modeling capabilities are the same as that of KIVA-4, and are based on the KIVA-4 unstructured grid code. The software is well suited for modeling internal combustion engines on multiple processors using the message passing interface (MPI). On August 9, 2011, LANL honored the authors of KIVA-4mpi with the Distinguished Copyright Award for demonstrating a breadth of commercial applications, potential to create economic value, and the highest level of technical excellence.

=== KIVA-EXEC ===
KIVA-EXEC is a free, reduced-functionality executable-only trial version of KIVA-4. KIVA-EXEC has all the performance of Los Alamos National Laboratory's premier KIVA-4 code, but with a 45K cell limitation. KIVA-EXEC is perfect for beginners who do not need or intend to modify the source code.

== KIVA videos ==
- KIVA4 slant valve
- Cubit scalloped bowl
- 4 Valve KIVA-4 mpi
- 4 Valve FEARCE, 2018 new FEM based LANL T-3 software (David Carrington and Jiajia Waters )

== Alternative software ==
- Advanced Simulation Library (open source: AGPL)
- COMSOL Multiphysics
- CLAWPACK
- Code Saturne (GPL)
- Coolfluid (LGPLv3)
- deal.II
- FEATool Multiphysics
- FreeCFD
- Gerris Flow Solver
- Nektar++
- OpenFVM
- SU2 code (LGPL)
