= SU2 =

SU2 may refer to:

- SU(2), the 2-dimensional special unitary group in mathematics
- SU-2, a scout version of the Vought O2U Corsair biplane
- SU2 code, a suite of open-source software tools written in C++ for the numerical solution of partial differential equations
- Sukhoi Su-2, a Soviet reconnaissance and light bomber aircraft used in the early stages of World War II

== Asteroids ==
- 3158 Anga (provisionally 1976 SU_{2}), a minor planet discovered on September 24, 1976
- 5499 (provisionally 1981 SU_{2}), a minor planet discovered on September 29, 1981
- 7887 Bratfest (provisionally 1993 SU_{2}), a minor planet discovered on September 18, 1993
