= ANSS =

ANSS may refer to:

- Advanced National Seismic System
- The NASDAQ stock-ticker of Ansys
- National Agency for Social Support
