= SU2 (software) =

Software for numerical solution of partial differential equations

- Release: January 2012; 14 years ago
- Stable release: 8.6.0 / 30 October 2026; 9 days ago
- Written in: C++, Python
- Operating system: Unix/Linux/OS X/Windows
- Type: Computational fluid dynamics, Simulation software
- License: GNU Lesser General Public License, version 2.1
- Website: su2code.github.io
- Repository: github.com/su2code/SU2

SU2 (formerly Stanford University Unstructured) is a suite of open-source software tools written in C++ and Python for the numerical solution of partial differential equations (PDE) and performing PDE-constrained optimization. While initially developed for aerodynamics and compressible flow, it has evolved into a general-purpose multiphysics framework capable of simulating incompressible and compressible flows across all Mach regimes, species transport, conjugate heat transfer and combustion.

The framework is specialized for gradient-based design optimization using integrated continuous and discrete adjoint solvers. A distinguishing feature for researchers is its use of algorithmic differentiation (AD) to provide exact discrete adjoint sensitivities for complex multiphysics chains, including fluid-structure interaction (FSI) and conjugate heat transfer. It supports unstructured meshes and offers extensibility through User Defined Functions (UDFs) and high-level Python wrappers.

To stimulate development and use of the software, the SU2 Foundation was established as a non-profit organization to coordinate the global community of users and developers. SU2 is released under the GNU Lesser General Public License (LGPL) version 2.1.

== Developers ==
SU2 is being developed by individuals and organized teams around the world. The original SU2 Lead Developers are: Dr. Francisco Palacios and Dr. Thomas D. Economon.

The most active groups developing SU2 are:

- Prof. Juan J. Alonso's group at Stanford University.
- Prof. Piero Colonna's group at Delft University of Technology.
- Prof. Nicolas R. Gauger's group at Kaiserslautern University of Technology.
- Prof. Alberto Guardone's group at Polytechnic University of Milan.
- Prof. Rafael Palacios' group at Imperial College London.

=== Capabilities ===
SU2 is a general-purpose multiphysics suite designed for the simulation of partial differential equations (PDE) on unstructured meshes. The framework is built to handle complex multi-physics interactions through a multi-zone approach, allowing different physical models to be solved in connected domains. Its current capabilities include:

- Flow Regimes: Compressible and incompressible solvers for Euler, Navier-Stokes, and RANS equations across all Mach regimes (low-speed to hypersonic). For low Mach incompressible flow problems, preconditioning methods are used.
- Turbulence & Transition Modeling:
  - RANS Models: Includes several variants of the Spalart-Allmaras (SA) and Menter's Shear Stress Transport (SST) models, including curvature and rotation corrections (QCR).. The turbulence models include classical wall functions.
  - Scale-Resolving Methods: Support for Large eddy simulation (LES), Detached eddy simulation (DES), and Delayed Detached Eddy Simulation (DDES) for unsteady separated flows.
  - Transition Modeling: $\gamma-Re_\theta$ transition model.
- Design Optimization: Gradient-based shape optimization using integrated continuous and discrete adjoint solvers. It utilizes algorithmic differentiation (via CoDiPack) for exact sensitivities in complex multiphysics chains.
- Topology Optimization: Gradient-based structural topology optimization with length scale control via black-white filters
- Multiphysics & Structures:
  - Solid Mechanics: Solvers for linear elasticity to model structural deformation.
  - Thermal Analysis: Capability for conjugate heat transfer (CHT) to simulate heat exchange between fluid and solid regions.
  - Fluid-Structure Interaction (FSI): Static and dynamic coupling between fluid and structural solvers.
- Chemistry & Hypersonics:
  - Combustion: Reacting flow modeling using the Flamelet generated manifold (FGM) method.
  - Hypersonics (NEMO): Simulation of high-enthalpy flows including thermo-chemical non-equilibrium and ionization with detailed chemistry modeling.
- Advanced Numerics: Support for high-order Discontinuous Galerkin Method (DG) for improved accuracy in vortex-dominated simulations.
- User Interface & Ecosystem:
  - SU2-GUI: A graphical user interface for mesh importation and solver configuration.
  - Automation: A high-level Python interface for workflow automation and support for User Defined Functions (UDFs).

== License ==
SU2 is free and open source software, released under the GNU General Public License version 3 (SU2 v1.0 and v2.0) and GNU Lesser General Public License version 2.1 (SU2 v2.0.7 and later versions).

== Alternative software ==
=== Free and open-source software ===
- Advanced Simulation Library (AGPL)
- Code Saturne (GPL)
- FreeFem++
- Gerris Flow Solver (GPL)
- OpenFOAM

=== Proprietary software ===
- ADINA CFD
- ANSYS CFX
- ANSYS Fluent
- Pumplinx
- STAR-CCM+
- COMSOL Multiphysics
- KIVA (software)
- RELAP5-3D
- SimScale
