= CORSIKA =

Physics computer software

CORSIKA, an Extensive Air Shower Simulation Program
- Original authors: Dieter Heck, Tanguy Pierog, Institut für Astroteilchenphysik, Forschungszentrum Karlsruhe, Germany; Johannes Knapp, Deutsches Elektronen-Synchrotron, Zeuthen, Germany
- Developer: CORSIKA collaboration
- Stable release: 7.8050 / December 18, 2025
- Operating system: UNIX
- Available in: FORTRAN 77
- Type: Astroparticle physics
- License: CORSIKA is available to every scientist free of charge (more)

CORSIKA (COsmic Ray SImulations for KAscade) is a physics computer software for simulation of extensive air showers induced by high energy cosmic rays, i.e. protons and atomic nuclei, as well as Gamma rays (photons), electrons, and neutrinos. It may be used up to and beyond the highest energies of 100 EeV.

In the current version the program utilizes the hadronic interaction models EPOS, QGSJET, and DPMJET, which are based on Gribov-Regge theory, and SIBYLL based on a minijet model for high energies. Hadronic interactions at lower energies are described either by the GHEISHA module, by FLUKA, or by the UrQMD model. Electromagnetic interactions are treated by an adapted version of the EGS4 code, customized by including the Landau–Pomeranchuk–Migdal effect relevant at higher energies.

It can be used to simulate the generation of Cherenkov radiation, radio emission (Askaryan radiation), and atmospheric neutrinos.

A complete rewrite of CORSIKA in C++ with enhanced capabilities named CORSIKA 8 is currently work in progress.A first release was published in 2026.
