= Overflow (software) =

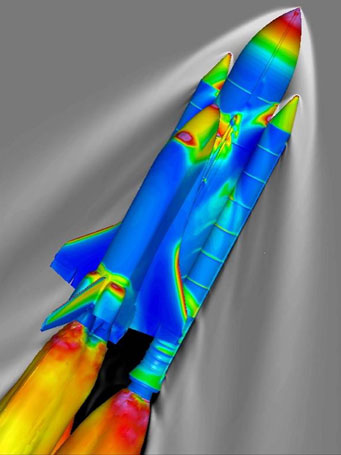
- This image depicts the flowfield around a Space Shuttle traveling at Mach 2.46 and at an altitude of 66,000 feet (20,000 m). The surface of the vehicle is colored by the pressure coefficient, and the gray contours represent the density of the surrounding air, as calculated using the OVERFLOW codes.
- Original authors: Pieter Buning, Dennis Jespersen, others
- Developer: NASA
- Stable release: 2.2k / 18 March 2015; 10 years ago
- Platform: Unix like
- Website: people.nas.nasa.gov/~pulliam/Overflow/Overflow_Manuals.html

OVERFLOW - the OVERset grid FLOW solver - is a software package for simulating fluid flow around solid bodies using computational fluid dynamics (CFD). It is a compressible 3-D flow solver that solves the time-dependent, Reynolds-averaged, Navier–Stokes equations using multiple overset structured grids.

== History ==
OVERFLOW was developed as part of a collaborative effort between NASA's Johnson Space Center in Houston, Texas and NASA Ames Research Center (ARC) in Moffett Field, California. The driving force behind this work was the need for evaluating the flow about the Space Shuttle launch vehicle. Originally developed in the early 1990s by NASA's Pieter Buning, Dennis Jespersen and others, the code is an outgrowth of earlier codes F3D and ARC3D, and a result of ARC's long history of flow-solver development.

== Usage ==
Scientists use OVERFLOW to better understand the aerodynamic forces on a vehicle by evaluating the flowfield surrounding the vehicle. While wind tunnel testing provides limited data at many flow conditions, CFD simulations provide detailed information about selected conditions, and also provide a distribution of forces on the vehicle, aiding in structural design.

OVERFLOW has also been used to simulate the effect of debris on the space shuttle launch vehicle.

== See also ==
- Computational fluid dynamics
- List of computational fluid dynamics software
