= OpenMC =

Open source computational physics program

- Developer: Massachusetts Institute of Technology
- Release: December 2012; 13 years ago
- Stable release: 0.16.0 / August 5, 2026; 49 days ago
- Written in: C++, Python
- Operating system: Linux, macOS, Windows
- Type: Computational physics
- License: MIT/X
- Website: openmc.org
- Repository: github.com/openmc-dev/openmc

OpenMC is a Monte Carlo neutron and photon simulation transport code. Initially developed by the Computational Reactor Physics Group at Massachusetts Institute of Technology (MIT) in 2011 as part of a project to develop scalable parallel algorithms for future exascale supercomputers, it has been contributed to by various universities, laboratories, and other institutions since its release to the public in December 2012. It is free and open-source software released with an X11 License (MIT/X Consortium License). Unlike other major Monte Carlo transport codes such as Monte Carlo N-Particle Transport Code (MCNP) or Serpent, it is not export controlled. It has been used in labs including the Consortium for Advanced Simulation of LWRs and the ANL Center for Exascale Simulation of Advanced Reactors.

Features of OpenMC include the ability to perform fixed source, k-eigenvalue, and subcritical multiplication calculations on models built with constructive solid geometry or computer-aided design (CAD). It also features large application programming interfaces (APIs) to expand its features for the programming languages C, C++, and Python.
