= Autodesk Simulation =

Finite element analysis software

- Stable release: Autodesk Simulation Mechanical/CFD 2014
- Operating system: Linux, Microsoft Windows
- Type: FEM software
- Website: www.autodesk.com

Autodesk Simulation is a general-purpose multiphysics finite element analysis software package initially developed by ALGOR Incorporated and acquired by Autodesk in January 2009. It is intended for use with Microsoft Windows and Linux operating systems. It is distributed in a number of different core packages to cater to specific applications, such as mechanical event simulation and computational fluid dynamics.

Under the ALGOR name, the software was used by scientists and engineers worldwide. It has found applications in aerospace.

== Typical uses ==
Typical uses include bending, mechanical contact, thermal (conduction, convection and radiation) fluid dynamics, and coupled or uncoupled multiphysics.

== Materials and elements database ==
Autodesk Simulation's library of material models includes metals and alloys, plastics, glass, foams, fabrics, elastomers, Concrete (with rebar), soils and user-defined materials.

Autodesk Simulation's element library depends on the geometry and the type of analysis performed. It includes 8 and 4 node solid, 8 and 4 node shell, as well as beam and rod elements.

== See also ==
- List of computational fluid dynamics software
