= Sinda (constituency) =

Constituency of the National Assembly of Zambia

Sinda is a constituency of the National Assembly of Zambia. It covers Sinda in Sinda District of Eastern Province. It comprises part of the Chewa Chiefdoms of Kawaza and Mbang'ombe.

== List of MPs ==
| Election year | MP | Party |
|---|---|---|
| 1991 | Naphtali Phiri | United National Independence Party |
| 1996 | Ephraim Kamwinga | Movement for Multi-Party Democracy |
| 2001 | Levy Ngoma | Forum for Democracy and Development |
| 2006 | Levy Ngoma | United Democratic Alliance |
| 2011 | Levy Ngoma | Movement for Multi-Party Democracy |
| 2016 | Masautso Tembo | Independent |
| 2021 | Masautso Tembo | Patriotic Front |
| 2026 | Masautso Tembo | National Reconciliation Party for Unity and Prosperity |
