= Sinda District =

Coordinates: 14°14′S 31°43′E

- District
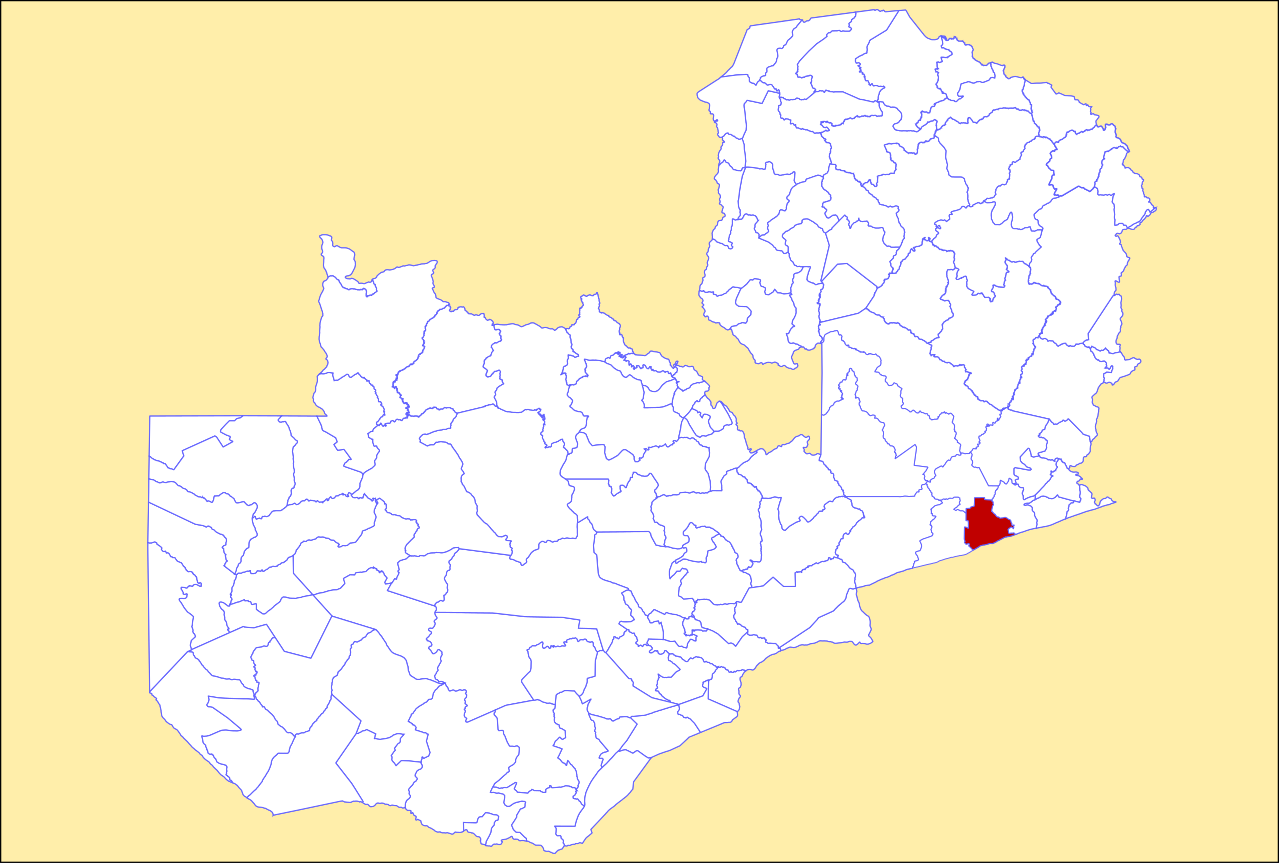
- District location in Zambia
- Country: Zambia
- Province: Eastern Province

Area
  - Total: 2,620.6 km^{2} (1,011.8 sq mi)

Population (2022)
  - Total: 213,762
  - Density: 81.570/km^{2} (211.26/sq mi)
- Time zone: UTC+2 (CAT)

The Sinda District is a district of Zambia, located in the Eastern Province. It was created in 2012 by taking part of Petauke District and part of Katete District. It consists of two constituencies, namely Sinda and Kapoche. As of the 2022 Zambian Census, the district had a population of 161,595 people.
