= Kameleon FireEx KFX =

- Developer(s): Computational Industry Technologies AS, ComputIT
- Stable release: KFX2010 V1.3
- Operating system: Linux
- Type: Computational fluid dynamics software
- License: Commercial software
- Website: http://www.computit.no/?module=Articles;action=Article.publicShow;ID=347

Kameleon FireEx KFX, often only referred to as KFX, is a commercial Computational Fluid Dynamics (CFD) program with main focus on gas dispersion and fire simulation.

KFX uses the k-epsilon model for turbulence modelling, the Eddy Dissipation Concept (EDC) for combustion modelling, and a radiation model based on the Discrete Transfer Method (DTM) by Lockwood and Shah.
