= Calculix =

Finite-element analysis application

CalculiX
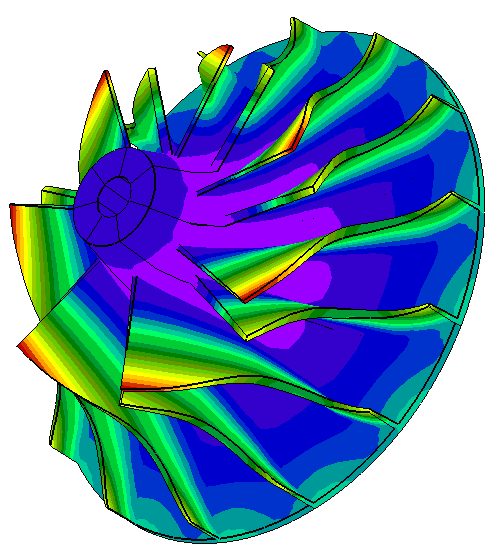
- Compressor of a turbocharger
- Original authors: Guido Dhondt, Klaus Wittig
- Initial release: 1998
- Stable release: 2.23 / October 19, 2025; 4 months ago
- Operating system: Linux, Windows
- Type: Finite element analysis
- License: GPL (free software)
- Website: www.dhondt.de, www.calculix.de
- Repository: github.com/Dhondtguido/CalculiX

CalculiX is a free and open-source finite-element analysis application that uses an input format similar to Abaqus. It has an implicit and explicit solver (CCX) written by Guido Dhondt and a pre- and post-processor (CGX) written by Klaus Wittig. The original software was written for the Linux operating system in 1998. Convergent Mechanical has ported the application to the Windows operating system.

The pre-processor component of CalculiX can generate grid data for the computational fluid dynamics programs duns, ISAAC and OpenFOAM. It can also generate input data for the commercial FEM programs Nastran, Ansys and Abaqus. The pre-processor can also generate mesh data from STL files.

There is an active online community that provides support at Discourse. Convergent Mechanical also provides installation support for their extended version of CalculiX for Windows.

There is a friendly CalculiX Launcher with CCX wizard for both Windows and Linux.

Also possible is the Installation in Windows 10 Fall Creator (1709) with the new Linux Subsystem WSL.

A Python library, pycalculix, was written to automate the creation of CalculiX models in the Python programming language. The library provides Python access to building, loading, meshing, solving, and querying CalculiX results for 2D models. Pycalculix was written by Justin Black. Examples and tutorials are available on the pycalculix site.

FreeCAD has developed a FEM workbench that automates the creation of CalculiX models.

There is a lot good examples of use of CalculiX by Prof. Martin Kraska, Brandenburg University of Applied Sciences.

The preCICE (software) adapter for CalculiX allows coupling it to other solvers to form partitioned multi-physics simulations.

The source code is distributed as archives on Guido Dhnond's website and via GitHub. The GitHub project includes an issue tracker. Contributions via pull requests are not directly merged, but the suggestions are incorporated manually by the maintainers, suggesting that the primary development takes place on a different repository.

== Literature ==
- Guido Dhondt: "The Finite Element Method for Three-Dimensional Thermomechanical Applications". Wiley, Hoboken 2004, ISBN 0-470-85752-8
- CCX v2.18 documentation
- CGX v2.18 documentation
- Getting Started Guide
- FreeCAD FEM workbench for CalculiX

== See also ==
- List of computational fluid dynamics software
