= CFD-FASTRAN =

Computational fluid dynamics software package

CFD-FASTRAN is a commercial computational fluid dynamics (CFD) software package developed by Applied Materials for aerodynamic and aerothermodynamic applications.

CFD-FASTRAN was used by the Council for Scientific and Industrial Research in South Africa to simulate the release of a missile from the outboard pylon of the BAE Hawk Mk120 at transonic speeds where shockwaves dominate the flowfield. The software was used to calculate the carriage loads, which are structural dynamic responses from the ejection forces, and model the loads on the missile in free-flight.

The software was used to predict supercooled droplet impingement on helicopter blades by the Institute for Aerospace Research. This is progress towards simulating ice formation on rotating helicopter blades.

CFD-FASTRAN was used to study the aerodynamic performance of a hypersonic vehicle powered by scramjet engines. Flow conditions were simulated at various angles of attack at Mach 5.85.

Two-dimensional numerical flow simulations were performed with CFD-FASTRAN to compare the effects of a combined jet flap and Coanda jet on a supercritical airfoil. The results showed that the combined jet flap provided the best performance.

CFD-FASTRAN was used to simulate flow past helicopter rotors in hover and forward flight conditions. The predictions matched the experimental data.

== See also ==
- List of computational fluid dynamics software
