= CFD-ACE+ =

Computational fluid dynamics solver

CFD-ACE+ is a commercial computational fluid dynamics solver developed by Applied Materials. It solves the conservation equations of mass, momentum, energy, chemical species and other scalar transport equations using the finite volume method. These equations enable coupled simulations of fluid, thermal, chemical, biological, electrical and mechanical phenomena.

CFD-ACE+ solver allows for coupled heat and mass transport along with complex multi-step gas-phase and surface reactions which makes it especially useful for designing and optimizing semiconductor equipment and processes such as chemical vapor deposition (CVD). Researchers at the Ecole Nationale Superieure d'Arts et Metiers used CFD-ACE+ to simulate the rapid thermal chemical vapor deposition (RTCVD) process. They predicted the deposition rate along the substrate diameter for silicon deposition from silane. They also used CFD-ACE+ to model transparent conductive oxide (TCO) thin film deposition with ultrasonic spray chemical vapor deposition (CVD). The University of Louisville and the Oak Ridge National Laboratory used CFD-ACE+ to develop the yttria-stabilized zirconia CVD process for application of thermal barrier coatings for fossil energy systems.

CFD-ACE+ was used by the Indian Institute of Technology Bombay to model the interplay of multiphysics phenomena involved in microfluidic devices such as fluid flow, structure, surface and interfaces etc. Numerical simulation of electroosmotic effect on pressure-driven flows in the serpentine channel of a micro fuel cell with variable zeta potential on the side walls was investigated and reported. Based on their extensive study of CFD software tools for microfluidic applications, researchers at IMTEK, University of Freiburg concluded that generally CFD-ACE+ can be recommended for simulation of free surface flows involving capillary forces.

CFD-ACE+ has also been used to design and optimize the various fuel cell components and stacks. Researchers at Ballard Power Systems used the PEMFC module in CFD-ACE+ to improve the design of its latest fuel-cell.

Amongst other energy applications, CFD-ACE+ was employed by ABB researchers to simulate the three-dimensional geometry of a high-current constricted vacuum arc drive by a strong magnetic field. Flow velocities were up to several thousand meters per second so the time step of the simulation was in the range of tens of nanoseconds. A movement of the arc over almost one full circle was simulated.

Researchers at the University of Akron used CFD-ACE+ to simulation flow patterns and pressure profiles inside a rectangular pocket of a hydrostatic journal bearing. The numerical results made it possible to determine the three-dimensional flow field and pressure profile throughout the pocket, clearance and adjoining lands. The inertia effects and pressure drops across the pocket were incorporated in the numerical model. Stanford University researchers used CFD-ACE+ to investigate the suppression of wake instabilities of a pair of circular cylinders in a freestream flow at a Reynolds number of 150. The simulation showed that when the cylinders are counter-rotated, unsteady vortex wakes can be eliminated.

== See also ==
- List of computational fluid dynamics software
- List of plasma physics software
