= Pumplinx =

Computational fluid dynamics software

PumpLinx
- Developer: Simerics
- Stable release: V.3.0 / 2011
- Operating system: Cross-platform
- Type: Computational Fluid Dynamics Software
- License: Proprietary
- Website: PumpLinx Software

PumpLinx is a 3-D computational fluid dynamics (CFD) software developed for the analysis of fluid pumps, motors, compressors, valves, propellers, hydraulic systems, and other fluid devices with rotating or sliding components.

== Features ==
The software imports 3-D geometry from CAD data in the form of STL files. It has geometry Conformal Adaptive Binary-Tree mesh generation tool which creates 3-D grid from CAD surfaces. For liquid devices, PumpLinx has a cavitation model to account for the effect of liquid vapor, free/dissolved gas, and liquid compressibility.

PumpLinx provides templates for different categories of devices, including: axial piston pumps, centrifugal pumps, gerotors, gear pumps, progressive cavity pumps, propellers, radial piston pumps, rotary vane pumps, submersible pumps, and valves.

Those templates create an initial grid for special rotors; for example, grids around gears of a gear pump, and then re-meshes the grid for a moving simulation, and provide device specific input and output. The output from the code include velocities, pressures, temperatures, and gas volume fractions of the flow field, together with integrated engineering data such as loads and torques.

PumpLinx uses a single Graphical User Interface (GUI) for grid generation, model set-up, execution, and post processing.

== Market ==
The software is used primarily by component and system engineers in the automotive, hydraulic, and aerospace industry as a virtual test-bed to study efficiency, cavitation, pressure ripple, and noise for hydrodynamic pumps, and fluid power equipment.

== See also ==
- List of computational fluid dynamics software
