= UrQMD =

UrQMD Hadron-String Transport Model
- Original authors: Steffen Bass, Marcus Bleicher, Horst Stöcker et al.
- Developer: Goethe University
- Stable release: UrQMD 3.4 / August 2014
- Operating system: UNIX
- Type: Monte Carlo method, Particle physics
- License: UrQMD user license

UrQMD (Ultra relativistic Quantum Molecular Dynamics) is a fully integrated Monte Carlo simulation package for Proton+Proton, Proton+nucleus and nucleus+nucleus interactions. UrQMD has many applications in particle physics, high energy experimental physics and engineering, shielding, detector design, cosmic ray studies, and medical physics.

Since version 3.3, an option has been incorporated to substitute part of the collision with a hydrodynamic model.

UrQMD is available in as open-source Fortran code.

UrQMD is developed using the FORTRAN language. Under Linux the gfortran compiler is necessary to build and run the program.

The UrQMD model is part of the GEANT4 simulation package and can be used as a low-energy hadronic interaction model within the air shower simulation code CORSIKA.
