= Systems Improved Numerical Differential Analyzer =

The Systems Improved Numerical Differential Analyzer (acronym SINDA) is a commercially available software system developed by C&R Technologies that solves resistor-capacitor (R-C) network representations of physical problems governed by diffusion equations. The software was originally designed as a general thermal analyzer for the spacecraft and launch vehicle thermal community and is currently an integral part of the Thermal Desktop plugin for AutoCAD.
