= Code Saturne =

Computational fluid dynamics software package

code_saturne
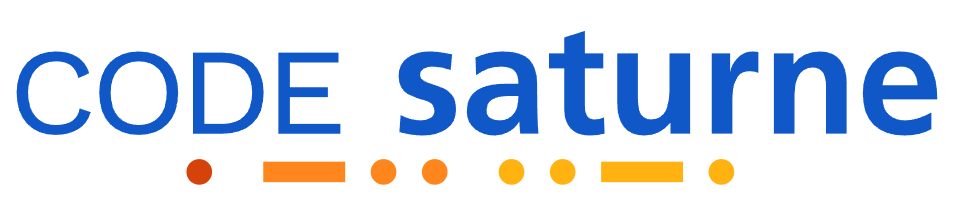
- Developer: EDF
- Release: 1997; 29 years ago
- Stable release: 9.0 / June 27, 2025
- Preview release: 9.2 / July 6, 2026
- Written in: C++, C, Fortran
- Operating system: Linux, Unix, macOS
- Available in: English
- Type: Computational fluid dynamics
- License: GNU GPL
- Website: code-saturne.org
- Repository: github.com/code-saturne/code_saturne

code_saturne is a free and open-source computational fluid dynamics (CFD) solver developed by the research and development division of Électricité de France (EDF). Released under the GNU General Public License since 2007, it is based on a co-located finite volume method and can simulate incompressible, low-Mach number dilatable flows or compressible flow, with or without turbulence and heat transfer.

The software is integrated into the SALOME platform through the salome_cfd distribution and can be coupled with the solid thermal code SYRTHES and the structural mechanics code code_aster, both also developed by EDF under free software licences.

Its two-phase extension, Neptune_CFD, co-developed by EDF and the CEA, handles two-phase flows such as water-steam and water-air mixtures.

== History ==
Development of code_saturne began in 1997 within EDF's R&D division as an internal tool for nuclear safety studies and thermohydraulics of nuclear power plants.

In March 2007, EDF released the code under the GNU General Public License, adopting an open development model. This release encouraged adoption by industrial and academic partners in France and internationally.

The software has since been selected as a benchmark application within the European PRACE (Partnership for Advanced Computing in Europe) project for evaluating supercomputer performance.

== Features ==
=== Numerical method ===
code_saturne is primarily based on a co-located finite volume discretisation of the Navier–Stokes equations. It supports unstructured meshes with tetrahedral, hexahedral, prismatic, pyramidal or general polyhedral cells, including hybrid and non-conforming meshes.

Several spatial and temporal discretisation schemes, gradient reconstruction methods, pressure–velocity solution strategies and iterative linear solvers are available. Alternative spatial discretisations based on Compatible Discrete Operator (CDO) schemes are also implemented for some equations and physical models.

Flow simulations may be steady or unsteady, laminar or turbulent, incompressible or compressible, and may include heat and scalar transport.

=== Turbulence models ===
code_saturne provides turbulence models covering Reynolds-averaged, scale-resolving and hybrid approaches. These include:

- RANS models, including variants of the k–ε family, k–ω SST, Spalart–Allmaras, v²–f models and Reynolds-stress models
- Large-eddy simulation (LES) models, including Smagorinsky, dynamic Smagorinsky and WALE formulations
- Hybrid RANS–LES methods, including DES, DDES, SAS and hybrid temporal LES.

Wall treatments include both wall-function approaches and models integrated to the wall.

=== Specific physical modules ===
In addition to its general-purpose flow solver, code_saturne includes dedicated models for several classes of physical phenomena:

- Combustion: gaseous combustion, including premixed and non-premixed flames, and pulverised-coal combustion
- Thermal radiation: radiative transfer in participating and semi-transparent media
- Compressible flows: compressible-flow models for subsonic and supersonic regimes, including flows involving shock waves
- Multiphase flows: volume-of-fluid (VOF) modelling of free surfaces and fluid interfaces, with support for surface tension and cavitation
- Atmospheric flows: atmospheric boundary layer modelling, dry and humid atmospheres, thermal stratification, meteorological forcing and pollutant dispersion
- Lagrangian particle tracking: transport of dispersed particles and droplets, including turbulent dispersion, deposition, thermal exchange, evaporation and coupling with the carrier phase
- Turbomachinery and rotating flows: rotating reference frames, frozen-rotor models, fan models and transient sliding-mesh simulations
- Electrical phenomena: electric-potential calculations, Joule heating, electric arcs and electromagnetic forces
- Magnetohydrodynamics: coupled modelling of electrically conducting fluids and electromagnetic fields.

=== Parallelisation and coupling ===
The code is parallelised using the Message Passing Interface (MPI) library, enabling it to run on high-performance computing (HPC) architectures. It can be coupled with the solid thermal code SYRTHES and the structural mechanics code code_aster, notably through the SALOME platform.

=== Interoperability ===
code_saturne is designed to interoperate with external meshing and post-processing software and supports several standard mesh and data formats. The software also provides mesh preprocessing capabilities and an internal Cartesian mesh generator, although it does not provide a general-purpose mesh-generation environment.

Supported mesh import formats include:

Format	Origin
MED	SALOME (EDF/CEA)
CGNS	CFD standard
Gmsh	Open-source
I-deas Universal	Siemens
GAMBIT Neutral	ANSYS
EnSight 6 / Gold	ANSYS
SIMAIL (NOPO)	INRIA/Simulog
STAR-CCM+	Siemens

Post-processing output formats:

- MED
- CGNS
- EnSight Gold

== Applications and users ==
code_saturne is used in both industrial and academic settings in France and internationally. Approximately 500 engineers and researchers use it within EDF.

=== Energy and nuclear safety ===
Originally designed for nuclear power plant safety studies, the software is used to analyse flows in primary circuits, cooling systems, coupled fluid-structure heat transfer, and steam generators. It is also employed for modelling wind farms, including turbine wake interactions and layout optimisation.

=== Environment and atmosphere ===
The software is used for modelling atmospheric flows, pollutant dispersion, air quality assessment, and wind-structure interactions.

=== Hydrodynamics and industry ===
code_saturne has been used by industrial partners for hydrodynamics applications, notably in the field of naval architecture.

=== Research and education ===
The software is used in universities and research organisations for developing and validating numerical models, as well as for teaching computational fluid dynamics.

== Development and community ==
Development is led by the R&D division of EDF. The source code is hosted on GitHub. Releases follow regular cycles.

A community of users, including engineers and researchers from industry and academia, contributes to the project through the development of physical models, associated tools, and validation cases. An official forum and technical documentation (user guides, reference manuals, tutorial cases) are available on the project website. A collection of code_saturne tutorials is also available online "code_saturne Tutorials".

== Key publications ==
The numerical foundations and validation of code_saturne are described in several peer-reviewed publications:

- Archambeau, F.; Méchitoua, N.; Sakiz, M. (2004). "Code_saturne: A finite volume code for the computation of turbulent incompressible flows – Industrial applications". International Journal on Finite Volumes. 1 (1).
- Fournier, Y.; Bonelle, J.; Moulinec, C.; Shang, Z.; Sunderland, A.G.; Uribe, J.C. (2011). "Optimizing Code_Saturne computations on Petascale systems". Computers & Fluids. 45 (1): 103–108. doi:10.1016/j.compfluid.2011.01.028.

== Availability ==
code_saturne runs on Linux and Unix. It is available as pre-compiled packages for distributions such as Debian and Ubuntu, through container images (Docker, Apptainer), or by compiling from source available on the official website.

Pre-compiled binaries and Singularity (.sif) and Docker container images are also provided by the Open Simulation Center platform, facilitating deployment on workstations or high-performance computing environments.

On Windows, the software can be used through the Windows Subsystem for Linux.

== Comparable software ==
Software	Licence
OpenFOAM	GPL
SU2	GPL
ANSYS Fluent	Proprietary
ANSYS CFX	Proprietary
Simcenter STAR-CCM+	Proprietary

== See also ==
- code_aster
- SALOME
- Computational fluid dynamics
- OpenFOAM
- Finite volume method
