= Nek5000 =

- Developer: ANL MCS Division
- Initial release: 1996; 29 years ago
- Stable release: 19.0 / 28 December 2019; 5 years ago
- Repository: github.com/Nek5000/Nek5000
- Written in: Fortran 77, C
- Operating system: Unix-like (typically Linux and macOS)
- Type: Spectral element method, Computational fluid dynamics
- License: BSD-3-Clause
- Website: nek5000.mcs.anl.gov,
- As of: 5 May 2023

Nek5000 is a highly scalable spectral element computational fluid dynamics code for solving the incompressible Navier-Stokes equations on 2D quadrilateral and 3D hexahedral meshes. Nek5000 was awarded the 1999 Gordon Bell Prize and a 2016 R&D 100 Award.

== See also ==
- List of computational fluid dynamics software
