= FLUKA =

FLUKA Particle Transport Code
- Original authors: Alberto Fassò, Alfredo Ferrari, Johannes Ranft, Paola Sala. Contributing authors: G.Battistoni, F.Cerutti, M.Chin, A.Empl, M.V.Garzelli, M.Lantz, A.Mairani, S.Muraro, V.Patera, S.Roesler, G.Smirnov, F.Sommerer, V. Vlachoudis
- Developers: INFN, CERN
- Initial release: 1960s
- Stable release: FLUKA 2021.2.0 / 18 May 2021
- Operating system: Linux
- Available in: Fortran 77
- Type: Monte Carlo method, Particle physics
- License: FLUKA user license
- Website: www.fluka.eu

FLUKA (an acronym for Fluktuierende Kaskade) is a fully integrated Monte Carlo simulation package for the interaction and transport of particles and nuclei in matter. FLUKA has many applications in particle physics, high energy experimental physics and engineering, shielding, detector and telescope design, cosmic ray studies, dosimetry, medical physics, radiobiology. A recent line of development concerns hadron therapy. As of 2022 FLUKA allowed simulation of interactions of photons with energy 100 eV and above.

It is the standard tool used in radiation protection studies in the CERN particle accelerator laboratory. FLUKA software code is used by Epcard, which is a software program for simulating radiation exposure on airline flights.

The first version of FLUKA was developed in the 1960s by Johannes Ranft. FLUKA makes use of combinatorial geometry.

== Comparison with other codes ==
MCNPX is slower than FLUKA.

Geant4 is slower than FLUKA.
