= Thermal hydraulics =

Study of hydraulic flow in thermal fluids

Thermal hydraulics (also called thermohydraulics) is the study of hydraulic flow in thermal fluids. The area can be mainly divided into three parts: thermodynamics, fluid mechanics, and heat transfer, but they are often closely linked to each other. A common example is steam generation in power plants and the associated energy transfer to mechanical motion and the change of states of the water while undergoing this process. Thermal-hydraulics analysis can determine important parameters for reactor design such as plant efficiency and coolability of the system.

The common adjectives are "thermohydraulic", "thermal-hydraulics" and "thermalhydraulics".

== Thermodynamic analysis ==
In the thermodynamic analysis, all states defined in the system are assumed to be in thermodynamic equilibrium; each state has mechanical, thermal, and phase equilibrium, and there is no macroscopic change with respect to time. For the analysis of the system, the first law and second law of thermodynamics can be applied.

In power plant analysis, a series of states can comprise a cycle. In this case, each state represents condition at the inlet/outlet of individual component. The example of components are pumpcompressor, turbine, reactor, and heat exchanger. By considering the constitutive equation for the given type of fluid, thermodynamic state of each point can be analyzed. As a result, the thermal efficiency of the cycle can be defined.

Examples of the cycle include the Carnot cycle, Brayton cycle, and Rankine cycle. Based on the simple cycle, modified or combined cycle also exists.

== Thermo-Hydraulic Improvement Parameter (THIP) ==
Authors observed that Thermo-hydraulic Parameter (THP) is less sensitive towards the Friction Factor Improvement Factor (FFER). The deviation between the terms (fR/fS) and (fR/fS)0.33 has been found 48 % to 64 % for the range of roughness and other parameters with (Re) 2900 – 14,000, which has been used for the present study. Therefore, to evaluate in equal proportions of enhancement in heat transfer (Nu) and friction factor (f) in the thermal systems a new parameter has been proposed and introduced by present article first author, which is more realistic and it is named as Thermo-hydraulic Improvement Parameter (THIP), and it can be evaluated as the ratio of (NNIF) to (FFIF) [Sahu et al.].

Where (NNIF)=Nusselt Number Improvement Factor and (FFIF)=Friction Factor Improvement Factor

== Temperature distribution ==
Temperature is an important quantity to know for the understanding of the system. Material properties such as density, thermal conductivity, viscosity, and specific heat depend on temperature, and very high or low temperature can bring unexpected changes in the system. In solid, the heat equation can be used to obtain the temperature distribution inside the material with given geometries.

For steady-state and static case, the heat equation can be written as

$$0 =\,\nabla\cdot k \,\nabla T\ \ +q'''$$

where Fourier's law of conduction is applied.

Applying boundary conditions gives a solution for the temperature distribution.

== Single-phase heat transfer ==
In single-phase heat transfer, convection is often the dominant mechanism of heat transfer. For adiabatic flow where the flow receives heat, the temperature of the coolant changes as it flows. An example of single-phase heat transfer is a gas-cooled reactor and molten-salt reactor.

The most convenient way for characterizing the single-phase heat transfer is based on an empirical approach, where the temperature difference between the wall and bulk flow can be obtained from the heat transfer coefficient. The heat transfer coefficient depends on several factors: mode of heat transfer (e.g., internal or external flow), type of fluid, geometry of the system, flow regime (e.g., laminar or turbulent flow), boundary condition, etc.

Examples of heat transfer correlations are Dittus-Boelter correlation (turbulent forced convection), Churchill & Chu (natural convection).

== Multi-phase heat transfer ==
Different two-phase flow regimes

Compared with single-phase heat transfer, heat transfer with a phase change is an effective way of heat transfer. It generally has high value of heat transfer coefficient due to the large value of latent heat of phase change followed by induced mixing of the flow. Boiling and condensation heat transfers are concerned with wide range of phenomena.

=== Pool boiling ===
Pool boiling is boiling at a stagnant fluid. Its behavior is well characterized by Nukiyama boiling curve, which shows the relation between the amount of surface superheat and applied heat flux on the surface. With the varying degrees of the superheat, the curve is composed of natural convection, onset of nucleate boiling, nucleate boiling, critical heat flux, transition boiling, and film boiling. Each regime has a different mechanism of heat transfer and has different correlation for heat transfer coefficient.

=== Flow boiling ===
Flow boiling is boiling at a flowing fluid. Compared with pool boiling, flow boiling heat transfer depends on many factors including flow pressure, mass flow rate, fluid type, upstream condition, wall materials, system geometry, and applied heat flux. Characterization of flow boiling requires comprehensive consideration of operating condition. In 2021 a prototype electric vehicle charging cable using flow boiling was able to remove 24.22 kW of heat, allowing the charging current to reach 2,400 amps, far higher than state of the art charging cables that top out at 520 amps.

=== Critical Heat Flux ===
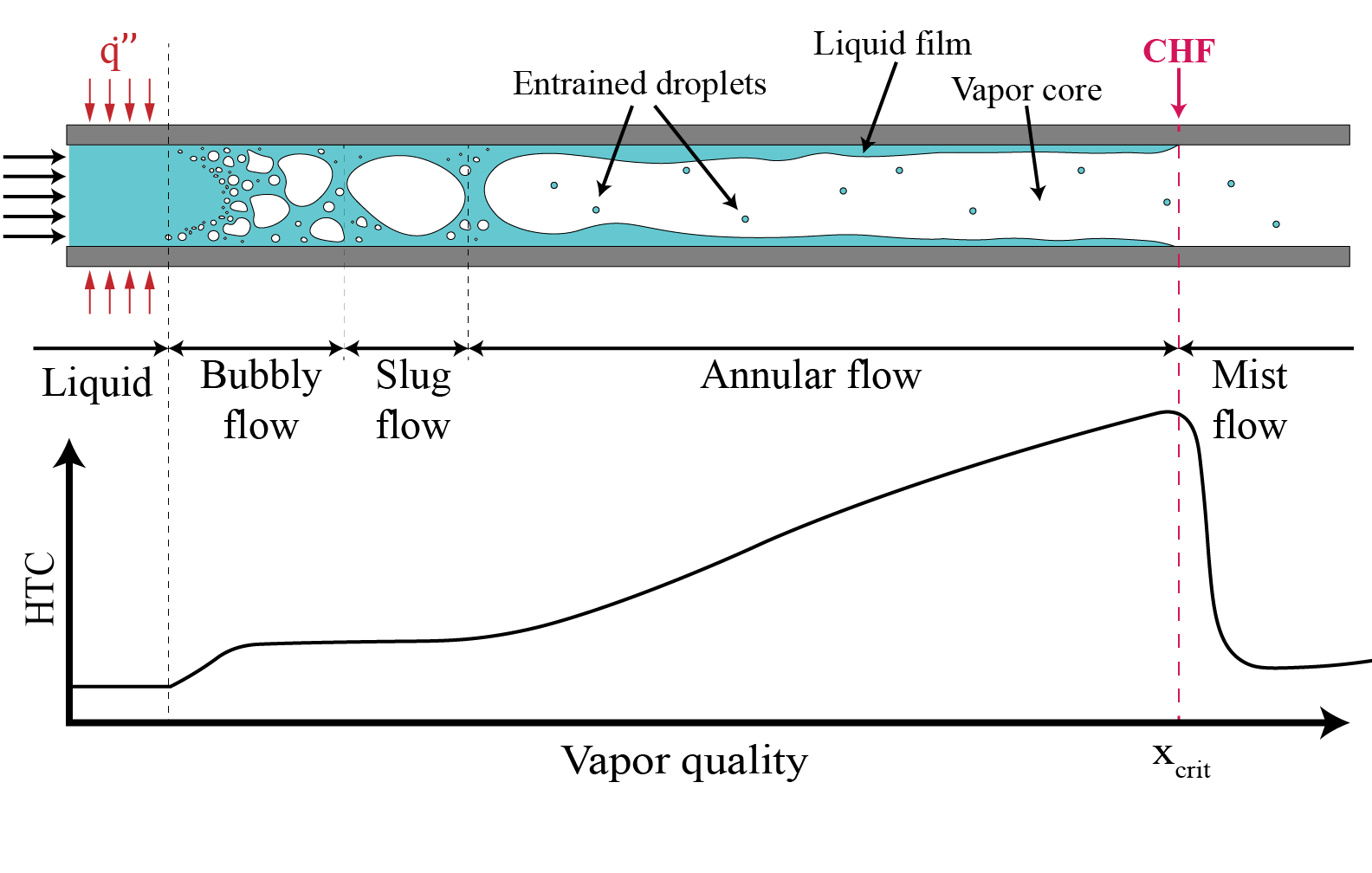
Flow boiling regime progression (top) and qualitative description of heat transfer (bottom)

Heat transfer coefficient due to nucleate boiling increases with wall superheat until they reach a certain point. When the applied heat flux exceeds the certain limit, heat transfer capability of the flow decreases or significantly drops. Normally, the critical heat flux (CHF) corresponds to departure from nucleate boiling (DNB) in pressurized water reactor (PWR) and dryout in boiling water reactor (BWR). The reduced heat transfer coefficient seen in post-DNB or post-dryout is likely to result in damaging of the boiling surface. Understanding of the exact point and triggering mechanism related to critical heat flux is a topic of interest.

=== Post-CHF Heat transfer ===
For DNB type of boiling crisis, the flow is characterized by creeping vapor fluid between liquid and the wall. On top of the convective heat transfer, radiation heat transfer contributes to the heat transfer. After the dryout, the flow regime is shifted from an inverted annular to mist flow.

== Other phenomena ==
Other thermal hydraulics phenomena are subject of interest:

- Critical discharge
- Countercurrent flow limitation
- Condensation
- Flow instability
- Rewetting

== See also ==
- Heat
- Heat pump
- Heat transfer coefficient
