= RELAP5-3D =

Simulates a nuclear reactor's coolant system and core

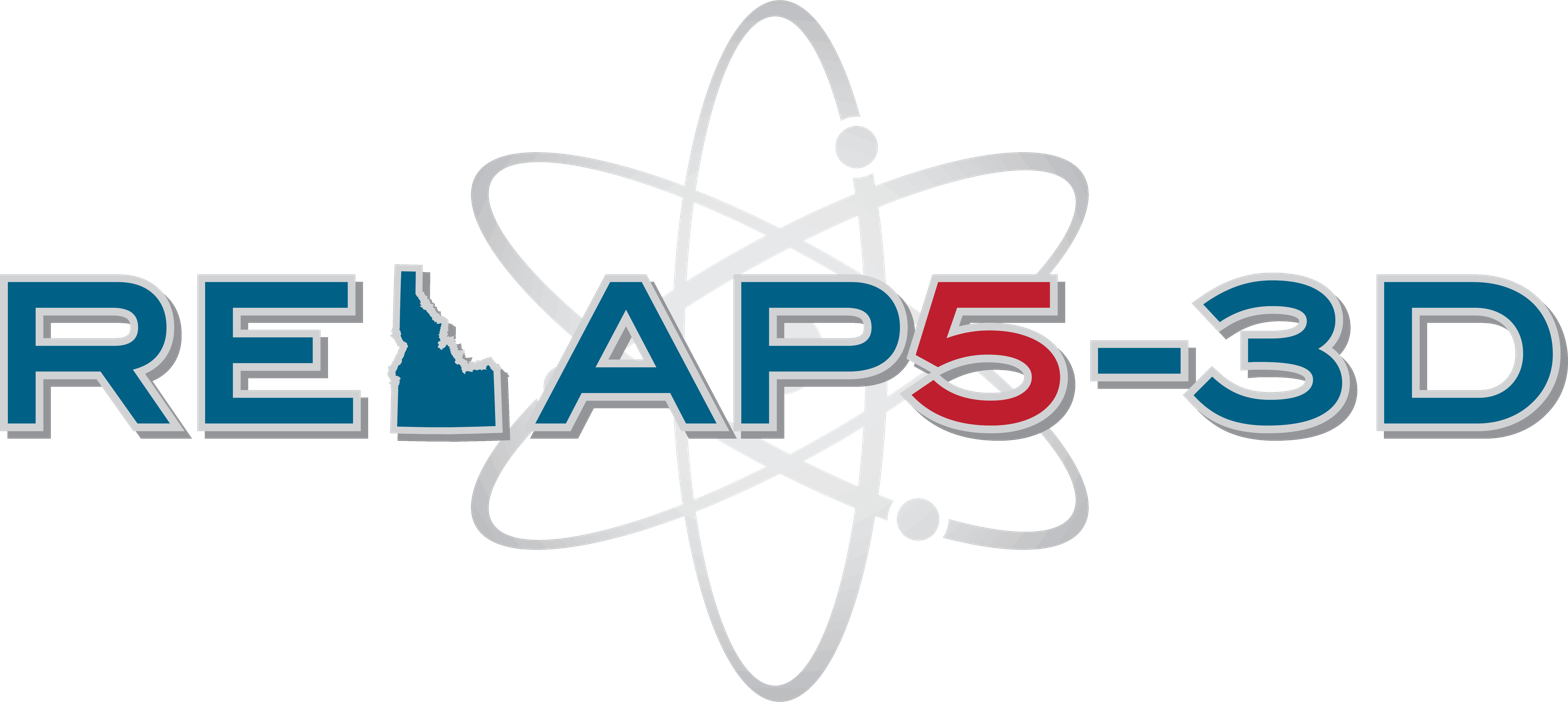
- RELAP5-3D is the latest in the RELAP5 code series developed at Idaho National Laboratory (INL) for the analysis of transients and accidents in water-cooled nuclear power plants and related systems as well as the analysis of advanced reactor designs.
- Developer: Idaho National Laboratory
- Initial release: July 6, 1997
- Stable release: RELAP5-3D/Ver: 4.4.2 (7 years, 10 months and 11 days ago)
- Operating system: Linux, Windows
- Available in: Fortran 95
- Type: Advanced Computational Engine
- License: Proprietary
- Website: relap53d.inl.gov/SitePages/Home.aspx

RELAP5-3D is a simulation tool that allows users to model the coupled behavior of a nuclear reactor's coolant system and the reactor core for various operational transients and postulated accidents that might occur in a nuclear reactor. RELAP5-3D (Reactor Excursion and Leak Analysis Program) can be used for reactor safety analysis, reactor design, simulator training of operators, and as an educational tool by universities. RELAP5-3D was developed at Idaho National Laboratory to address the pressing need for reactor safety analysis and continues to be developed through the United States Department of Energy and the International RELAP5 Users Group (IRUG) with over $3 million invested annually. The code is distributed through INL's Technology Deployment Office and is licensed to numerous universities, governments, and corporations worldwide.

== Background ==
RELAP5-3D is an outgrowth of the one-dimensional RELAP5/MOD3 code developed at Idaho National Laboratory (INL) for the U.S. Nuclear Regulatory Commission (NRC). The U.S. Department of Energy (DOE) began sponsoring additional RELAP5 development in the early 1980s to meet its own reactor safety assessment needs. Following the Chernobyl disaster, DOE undertook a re-assessment of the safety of all its test and production reactors throughout the United States. The RELAP5 code was chosen as the thermal-hydraulic analysis tool because of its widespread acceptance.

The application of RELAP5 to various reactor designs created the need for new modeling capabilities. In particular, the analysis of the Savannah River reactors necessitated a three-dimensional flow model. Later, under laboratory-discretionary funding, multi-dimensional reactor kinetics were added.

Up until the end of 1995, INL maintained NRC and DOE versions of the code in a single source code that could be partitioned before compilation. It became clear by then, however, that the efficiencies realized by the maintenance of a single source were being overcome by the extra effort required to accommodate sometimes conflicting requirements. The code was therefore "split" into two versions—one for NRC and the other for DOE. The DOE version maintained all of the capabilities and validation history of the predecessor code, plus the added capabilities that had been sponsored by the DOE before and after the split.

The most prominent attribute that distinguishes the DOE code from the NRC code is the fully integrated, multi-dimensional thermal-hydraulic and kinetic modeling capability in the DOE code. This removes any restrictions on the applicability of the code to the full range of postulated reactor accidents. Other enhancements include a new matrix solver, additional water properties, and improved time advancement for greater robustness.

== Features ==
=== Modeling Capability ===
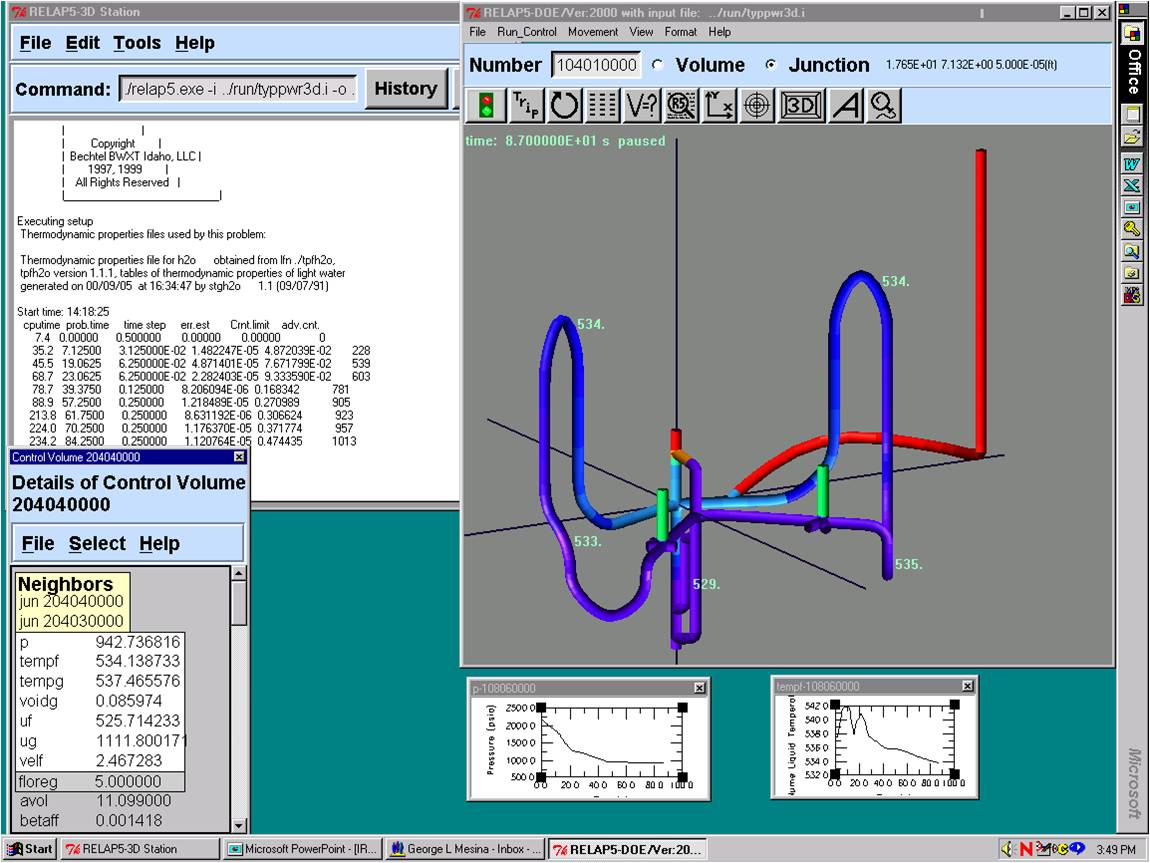
Screen capture of a three-dimensionally rotatable RELAP5-3D model of the Westinghouse Zion Nuclear Power Station showing the void fraction (mixture of liquid and gaseous water by volume) as a number between 0 and 1. Violet portions represent 100% water, while red portions indicate 100% steam. Other shades indicate the composition of the two-phase mixture. Users can overlay text on the image and add auxiliary widgets (such as plots and updating tables) to the desktop.

RELAP5-3D has multidimensional thermal hydraulics and neutron kinetic modeling capabilities. The multidimensional component in RELAP5-3D was developed to allow the user to accurately model the multidimensional flow behavior that can be exhibited in any component or region of a nuclear reactor coolant system. There is also two dimensional conductive and radiative heat transfer capability and modeling of plant trips and control systems. RELAP5-3D allows for the simulation of the full range of reactor transients and postulated accidents, including:

- Trips and controls
- Component models (pumps, valves, separators, branches, etc.)
- Operational transients
- Startup and shutdown
- Maneuvers (e.g. change in power level, starting/tripping pump)
- Small and large break Loss Of Coolant Accidents (LOCA)
- Anticipated Transient Without Scram (ATWS)
- Loss of offsite power
- Loss of feedwater
- Loss of flow
- Light Water Reactors (PWR, BWR, APWR, ABWR, etc.)
- Heavy Water Reactors (e.g. CANDU reactor)
- Gas-cooled Reactors (VHTGR, NGNP)
- Liquid metal cooled reactors
- Molten-salt cooled reactors

=== Hydrodynamic Model ===
RELAP5-3D is a transient, two-fluid model for flow of a two-phase vapor/gas-liquid mixture that can contain non-condensable components in the vapor/gas phase and/or a soluble component in the liquid phase. The multi-dimensional component in RELAP5-3D was developed to allow the user to more accurately model the multi-dimensional flow behavior that can be exhibited in any component or region of an LWR system. Typically, this will be the lower plenum, core, upper plenum and downcomer regions of an LWR. However, the model is general, and is not restricted to use in the reactor vessel. The component defines a one, two, or three-dimensional array of volumes and the internal junctions connecting them. The geometry can be either Cartesian (x, y, z) or cylindrical (r, q, z). An orthogonal, three-dimensional grid is defined by mesh interval input data in each of the three coordinate directions.

The functionality of the multi-dimensional component has been under testing and refinement since it was first applied to study the K reactor at Savannah River in the early 1990s. A set of ten verification test cases with closed form solutions are used to demonstrate the correctness of the numerical formulation for the conservation equations.

Recent developments have updated the programming language to FORTRAN 95 and incorporated viscous effects in multi-dimensional hydrodynamic models. Currently, RELAP5-3D contains 27 different working fluids including:

- Light water (e.g. 1967, 1984, and 1995 steam tables)
- Heavy water
- Gases (e.g. helium and carbon dioxide)
- Molten salts (e.g. FLiBe and FLiNaK)
- Liquid metals (e.g. sodium and lead-bismuth eutectic)
- Alternative fluids (e.g. glycerin and ammonia)
- Refrigerants (e.g. R-134a)

Working fluids allow single-phase, two-phase, and supercritical applications.

=== Thermal Model ===
Heat structures provided in RELAP5-3D permit calculation of heat transferred across solid boundaries of hydrodynamic volumes. Modeling capabilities of heat structures are general and include fuel pins or plates with nuclear or electrical heating, heat transfer across steam generator tubes, and heat transfer from pipe and vessel walls. Temperature-dependent and space-dependent thermal conductivities and volumetric heat capacities are provided in tabular or functional form either from built-in or user-supplied data. There is also a radiative/conductive enclosure model, for which the user may supply/view conductance factors.

=== Control System ===
RELAP5-3D allows the user to model a control system typically used in hydrodynamic systems, including other phenomena described by algebraic and ordinary differential equations. Each control system component defines a variable as a specific function of time-advanced quantities; this permits control variables to be developed from components that perform simple, basic operations.

=== Reactor Kinetics ===
There are two options that include a point reactor kinetics model and a multidimensional neutron kinetics model. A flexible neutron cross section model and a control rod model have been implemented to allow for the complete modeling of the reactor core. The decay heat model developed as part of the point reactor kinetics model has been modified to compute decay power for point reactor kinetics and multi-dimensional neutron kinetics models.

== Recent Major Upgrades ==
=== Accurate Verification Capability ===
Verification ensures the program is built right by: (1) showing it meets its design specifications, (2) comparing its calculations against analytical solutions and method of manufactured solutions. RELAP5-3D Sequential Verification writes a file of extremely accurate representations of primary variables for comparing calculations between code versions to reveal any changes. The test suite of input models exercise code capabilities important for modeling nuclear plants. This verification capability also provides means to test that important code functions such as restart and backup work properly.

=== Moving System Modeling Capability ===
The ability to simulate movement, such as could be encountered in ships, airplanes, or a terrestrial reactor during an earthquake becomes available in the 2013 release of RELAP5-3D. This capability allows the user to simulate motion through input, including translational displacement and rotation about the origin implied by the position of the reference volume. The transient rotation can be input using either Euler or pitch-yaw-roll angles. The movement is simulated using a combination of sine functions and tables of rotational angles and translational displacement. Since the gravitational constant is also an input quantity, this capability is not limited to the surface of the Earth. It allows RELAP5-3D to model reactor systems on space craft, a space station, the moon, or other extraterrestrial bodies.

== International RELAP5 Users Group ==
There are five different levels of membership available in the International RELAP5 Users Group (IRUG). Each has a different level of benefits, services, and membership fee.

=== Members ===
A full member organization is the highest level of participation possible in the IRUG. Members receive the RELAP5-3D software in source code form. Multiple copy use is allowed. Two levels of membership are available: Regular and "Super User". Regular Member organizations receive up to 40 hours of on-call assistance in areas such as model noding, code usage recommendations, debugging, and interpretations of results from INL RELAP5 technical experts. Super Users receive up to 100 hours of staff assistance.

=== Multi-Use Participants ===
Multi-use participants are organizations that require use of the code but do not need or desire all the benefits of a full member. Participants receive the RELAP5-3D software in executable form only. Multiple copy use is allowed. Participants receive up to 20 hours of staff assistance.

=== Single-Use Participants ===
Single-use participants are restricted to use RELAP5-3D on a single computer, one user at a time. They receive the RELAP5-3D executable code and may receive up to 5 hours of staff assistance.

=== University Participants ===
University Participants may acquire a license to RELAP5-3D for educational purposes.

=== Training Participants ===
Training participants have two main options available: they can receive a 3-month single-use license for the RELAP5-3D code and up to 10 hours of staff assistance, or a 3-month multiple-use license and up to 40 hours of on-call technical assistance. Alternative arrangements can be made based on customers' needs. These levels of participation are designed for those interested in participating in training courses. One set of RELAP5-3D training videos is included.

== Major RELAP5-3D Releases ==
Version	Date of Release
RELAP5-3D 1.0.0	July 6, 1997
RELAP5-3D 1.0.05	September 19, 1997
RELAP5-3D 1.0.08	September 24, 1998
RELAP5-3D 1.1.0	November 23, 1998
RELAP5-3D 1.1.7	August 4, 1999
RELAP5-3D 1.1.72	October 28, 1999
RELAP5-3D 1.2.0	May 5, 2000
RELAP5-3D 1.2.2	June 26, 2000
RELAP5-3D 1.3.5	March 14, 2001
RELAP5-3D 2.0.3	August 21, 2002
RELAP5-3D 2.2	October 30, 2003
RELAP5-3D 2.4	October 5, 2006
RELAP5-3D 3.0.0	November 29, 2010
RELAP5-3D 4.0.3	July 12, 2012
RELAP5-3D 4.1.3	October 8, 2013
RELAP5-3D 4.2.1	June 30, 2014
RELAP5-3D 4.3.4	October 9, 2015
RELAP5-3D 4.4.2	June 25, 2018

== See also ==
- List of computational fluid dynamics software

== See also ==
- Thermal-hydraulics
- Nuclear safety
- Computational fluid dynamics
