= COMSOL Multiphysics =

Physics and engineering software package

- Developer: COMSOL AB
- Stable release: 6.4 / November 18, 2025; 8 months ago
- Operating system: Cross-platform
- Type: Computer-aided engineering, Finite element analysis
- License: Proprietary EULA
- Website: www.comsol.com

COMSOL AB
- Type: Private company
- Industry: Computer software
- Founded: Stockholm, Sweden (1986)
- Key people: Svante Littmarck, CEO COMSOL Group Farhad Saeidi, President COMSOL AB
- Products: COMSOL Multiphysics, COMSOL Server, COMSOL Compiler
- Website: www.comsol.com

COMSOL Multiphysics is a finite element analyzer, solver, and simulation software package for various physics and engineering applications, especially coupled phenomena and multiphysics. The software facilitates conventional physics-based user interfaces and coupled systems of partial differential equations (PDEs). COMSOL Multiphysics provides an IDE and unified workflow for electrical, mechanical, fluid, acoustics, and chemical applications.

Beside the classical problems that can be addressed with application modules, the core Multiphysics package can be used to solve PDEs in weak form. An API for Java and MATLAB can be used to control the software externally. The program also serves as an application builder for physics applications. Several modules are available for COMSOL, categorized according to the applications areas of Electrical, Mechanical, Fluid, Acoustic, Chemical, Multipurpose, and Interfacing.

== Company history ==
COMSOL was founded in 1986 in Stockholm, Sweden, by Svante Littmarck and Farhad Saeidi. For the first 12 years, COMSOL worked closely with MATLAB, as a distributor and software partner. In 1998, the company released the first version of FEMLAB, a specialized finite element package built on top of MATLAB. In 2003 FEMLAB became a standalone product, no longer requiring MATLAB, and in 2005, FEMLAB was renamed COMSOL Multiphysics.

== COMSOL Script and Controversy ==
In 2003 MathWorks informed COMSOL that they would not be renewing COMSOL as a distributor. In response, COMSOL developed COMSOL Script, a clone of the MATLAB programming language and started selling it around 2005. MathWorks filed suit in 2006 for infringement of copyright and breach of contract, in which they won and were awarded $7.5 million in compensation. Mathworks presented this suit as amicus curiae in the more well-known Google LLC v. Oracle America, Inc. suit, where Oracle argued that Google violated copyright law by re-implementing the "declaring code".

== See also ==
- Finite element method
- Multiphysics
- List of computer simulation software
