= Bréhat =

Bréhat may refer to:

- Île-de-Bréhat, an island located off the northern coast of Brittany.
- BRÉHAT, a real-time localization system employed by SNCF.
- Great Brehat, a settlement in Newfoundland and Labrador, Canada

== See also ==
- Paimpol–Bréhat tidal farm, tidal turbine demonstration farm off Île-de-Bréhat near Paimpol, France
