= OpenHydro =

Defunct Irish turbine developer company

OpenHydro Group Ltd
- Founded: 2004; 22 years ago
- Defunct: 2018
- Headquarters: Dublin, Ireland
- Products: Tidal stream turbines

OpenHydro Group Ltd was an Irish developer of tidal stream turbines, established in 2004. It was acquired by Naval Energies (then DCNS) in 2013, however, Naval Energies decided in July 2018 to stop developing tidal turbines and focus on floating wind turbines. The company subsequently went into liquidation with debts of about €280m.

OpenHydro was based in Dublin and had a manufacturing facility in Greenore, Ireland. Naval Energies unveiled a new factory in Cherbourg-en-Cotentin, France, alongside the International Conference on Ocean Energy (ICOE2018), just weeks before exiting the tidal energy market.

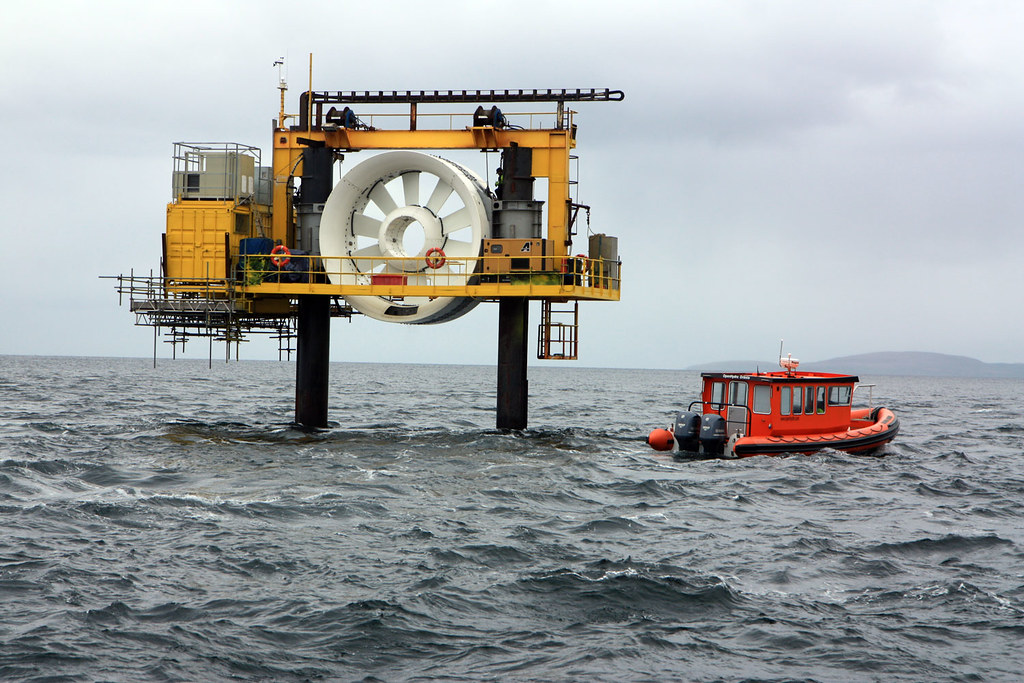
OpenHydro turbine on test at EMEC, Orkney, in the raised maintenance position. Subsequent turbines sat on the sea floor.

OpenHydro developed an open-centred horizontal-axis turbine, surrounded by a ducting shroud which was claimed to have multiple benefits: increased flow through the turbine, helps align the flow through the turbine, and housed the rim-mounted direct-drive generator thus removing the need for a gearbox.

Various iterations of the OpenHydro turbines were tested in Scotland, France, and Canada.

== Testing at EMEC ==
The first 250 kW Open Hydro turbine was tested at the European Marine Energy Centre (EMEC) Fall of Warness site from 2006, and was connected to the Orkney electricity grid in May 2008. The seventh generation 6 m diameter Open Hydro turbine was installed at the same EMEC site in April 2014. The turbine on test at EMEC was mounted on two piles, allowing it to be raised out of the water for maintenance, as shown in the photo (right). However, subsequent turbines sat on the seabed on a gravity foundation. The test structure at EMEC was decommissioned and removed in the summer of 2024, with the piles cut off at the seabed by diamond wire cutting.

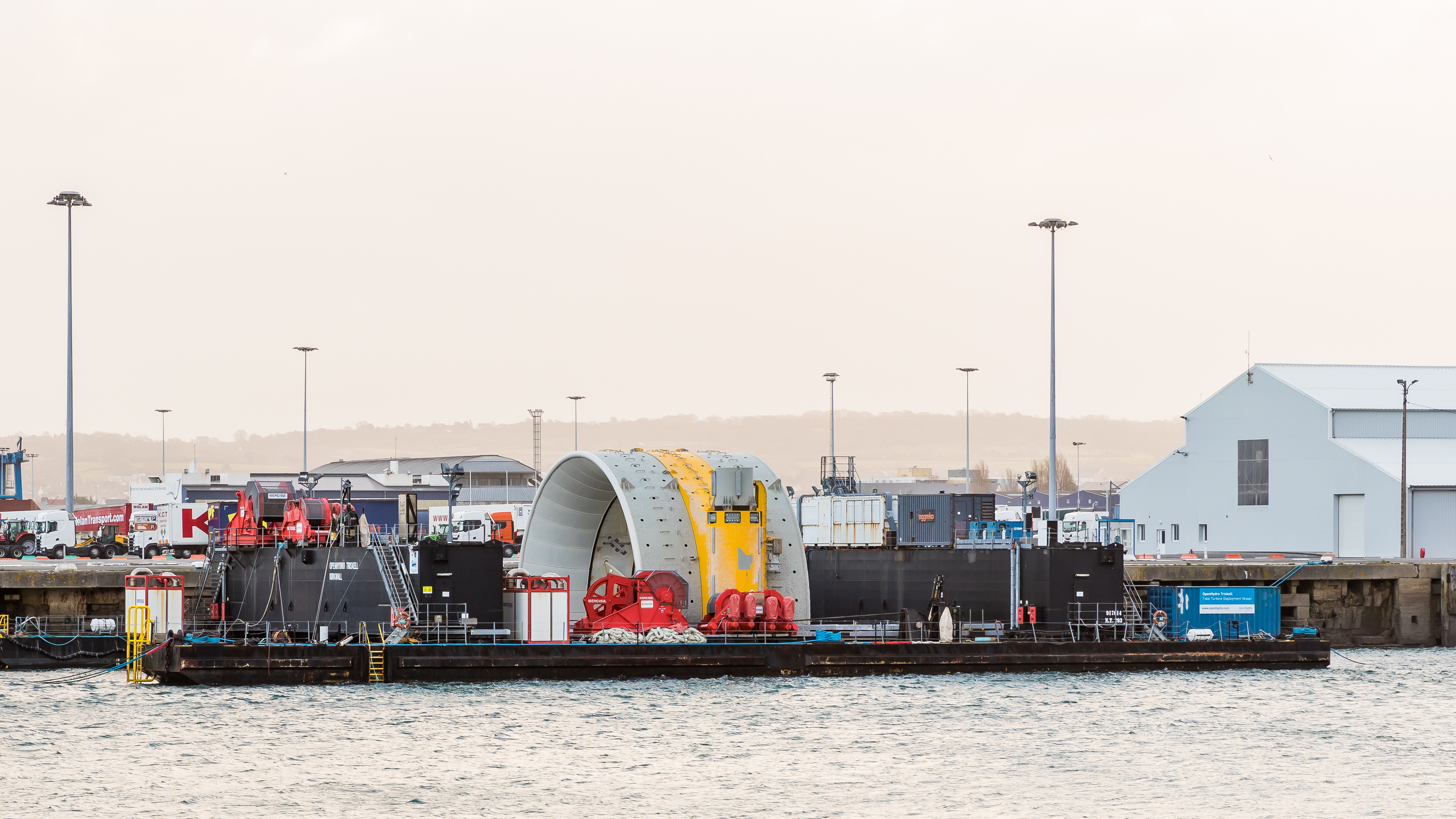
Openhydro Triskell - turbine deployment barge in the Port of Cherbourg

== Paimpol–Bréhat tidal farm ==
Électricité de France (EdF) started to develop a tidal farm at Paimpol–Bréhat, Brittany, France that would use OpenHydro turbines. A 250 kW turbine named L’Arcouest (Note: Presumably named after the place on the mainland L'Arouest in Ploubazlanec commune, where the ferry to Île-de-Bréhat sails from.) was tested there between December 2013 and April 2014. Two 16m diameter 500kW turbines were installed in January and May 2016, however these turbines were never connected to the grid. They were removed for repair in 2017 but not re-installed. The project was cancelled in 2018.

The turbines were lowered to the seabed, and subsequently removed, by a specially designed catamaran barge, the OpenHydro Triskell. The turbine sat between the hulls, partially in the water.

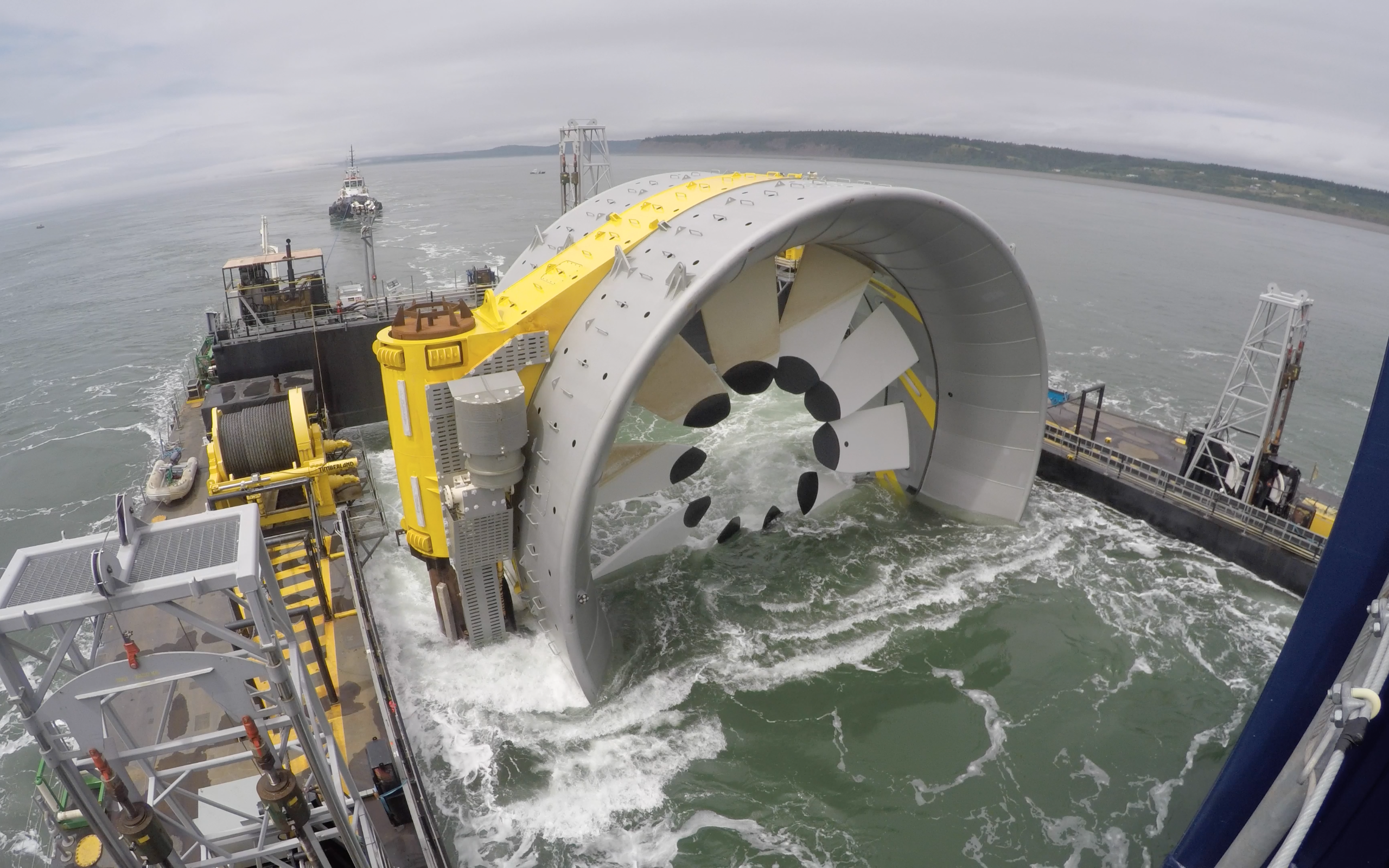
OpenHydro deployment at FORCE, Bay of Fundy.

== Cape Sharp Tidal ==
Cape Sharp Tidal was a joint venture of OpenHydro and Emera (the parent company of Nova Scotia Power) that tested OpenHydro turbines at the Fundy Ocean Research Centre for Energy (FORCE). A 10 m diameter, 1 MW turbine was deployed in November 2009, however it suffered serious damage to the blades just 20 days later. A 2 MW grid-connected turbine was then tested from November 2016 to June 2017. In July 2018, a second 2 MW grid-connected turbine was installed. This turbine was left on the seabed when OpenHydro filed for bankruptcy, suggesting it was damaged beyond repair. The device was expected to be removed before the end of 2024 by the next company lined up to test at FORCE Berth D, BigMoon Canada Corp. In May 2024, Big Moon Power rebranded as Occurrent Power, however in September it also filed for insolvency. The Provence of Nova Scotia still holds a $4.5-million bond to retrieve the turbine.

== Other projects ==
OpenHydro was about to develop the 14 MW Normandie Hydro project at La Raz Blanchard, Brittany, to be operated by EDF Energies Nouvelles. They were approved by the European Commission in July 2018 to receive funding from the French government.

In April 2014, OpenHydro and Alderney Renewable Energy announced plans to develop a 300 MW tidal array off the coast of Alderney in the Channel Islands. The array was expected to have 150 turbines, rated at 2 MW each.
