= Gerris (software) =

Computer Software

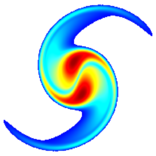

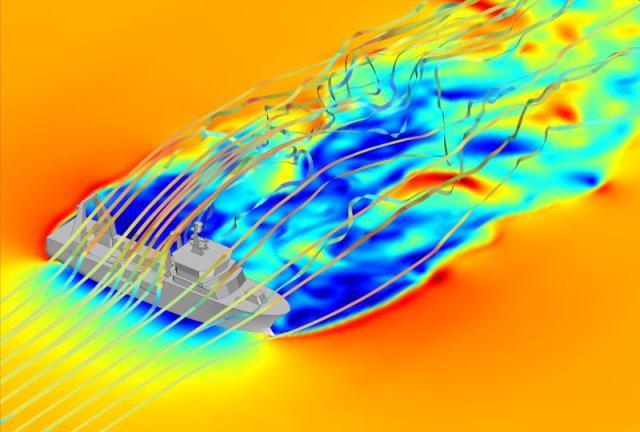
- Air flow around RV Tangaroa
- Initial release: 2001; 24 years ago
- Written in: C
- Operating system: Unix, Linux
- Successor: Basilisk
- Type: CFD
- Licence: GPL
- Website: gfs.sourceforge.net

Gerris is computer software in the field of computational fluid dynamics (CFD). Gerris was released as free and open-source software, subject to the requirements of the GNU General Public License (GPL), version 2 or any later.

== Scope ==
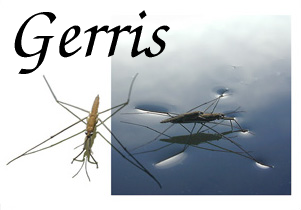
Banner of the Gerris website

Gerris solves the Navier–Stokes equations in 2 or 3 dimensions, allowing to model industrial fluids (aerodynamics, internal flows, etc.) or for instance, the mechanics of droplets, thanks to an accurate formulation of multiphase flows (including surface tension). Actually, the latter field of study is the reason why the software shares the same name as the insect genus.

Gerris also provides features relevant to geophysical flows:

1. ocean tide
2. tsunamis
3. river flow
4. eddies in the ocean
5. sea state (surface waves)

Flow types #1 to #3 were studied using the shallow-water solver included in Gerris, case #4 brings in the primitives equations and application #5 relies on the spectral equations for generation/propagation/dissipation of swell (and/or wind sea): for this purpose Gerris makes use of the source terms from WaveWatchIII.

Lastly, one can note that the (non-hydrostatic) Navier–Stokes solver was also used in the ocean to study:

- fluvial plumes
- internal waves
- hydrothermal convection

On the contrary Gerris does not allow the modeling of compressible fluids (supersonic flows).

== Numerical scheme ==
Several methods can be used to provide a numerical solution to partial differential equations:

- finite differences
- finite volumes
- finite elements

Gerris belongs to the finite volumes family of CFD models.

== Type of grid ==
Most models use meshes which are either structured (Cartesian or curvilinear grids) or unstructured (triangular, tetrahedral, etc.). Gerris is quite different on this respect: it implements a deal between structured and unstructured meshes by using a tree data structure, (Note: quadtree en 2D, octree en 3D) allowing to refine locally (and dynamically) the (finite-volume) description of the pressure and velocity fields. Indeed, the grid evolves in the course of a given simulation owing to criteria defined by the user (e.g. dynamic refinement of the grid in the vicinity of sharp gradients).

== Turbulent closure ==
Gerris mainly aims at DNS; the range of Reynolds available to the user thus depends on the computing power they can afford (although the auto-adaptive mesh allows one to focus the computing resources on the coherent structures). According to the Gerris FAQ the implementation of turbulence models will focus on the LES family rather than RANS approaches.

== Programming language, library dependencies, included tools ==
Gerris is developed in C using the libraries Glib (object orientation, dynamic loading of modules, etc.) and GTS. The latter brings in facilities to perform geometric computations such as triangulation of solid surfaces and their intersection with fluid cells. Moreover Gerris is fully compliant with MPI parallelisation (including dynamic load balancing).

Gerris does not need a meshing tool since the local (and time dependent) refinement of the grid is on charge of the solver itself. As far as solid surfaces are concerned, several input formats are recognized:

- analytic formulas in the parameter file
- GTS triangulated files; note that the Gerris distribution includes a tool to translate the STL format (exported by various CAD software) into GTS triangulated surfaces
- bathymetric/topographic database in KDT format; a tool is also provided to generate such a database from simple ASCII listings

Among the various ways to output Gerris results, let us just mention here:

- Graphical output in PPM format: images can then be converted in (nearly) any format using ImageMagick, and MPEG movies can be generated thanks to FFmpeg (among others).
- Simulation files (.gfs), which are actually parameters files concatenated with fields issued from the simulation; these files can then be (i) re-used as parameter files (defining new initial conditions), or (ii) processed with Gfsview.
- Gfsview, a display software shipped with Gerris, able to cope with the tree structure of the Gerris grid (a data structure which is not efficiently operated by general visualization software (Note: However, Gerris also provides a module exporting its results in Esri Grid format.)).

== Licence ==
CFD software, as any software, can be developed in various "realms":

- Business;
- Academic;
- Open Source.

As far as CFD is concerned, a thorough discussion of these software development paths can be found in the statement by Zaleski.

Gerris was distributed as free and open-source software right from the onset of the project.

== Continued development ==
Following a redesign of the software organization, Gerris became Basilisk, which allows one to develop its own solver (not necessarily in fluid mechanics) using various data structures (including of course the quadtree/octree) and optimized operators for iteration, derivation, etc. Solvers are written in C, more specifically the Basilisk C. However many solvers are available "turnkey", including Navier-Stokes et Saint-Venant.

== See also ==
Other computing software are freely available in the field of fluid mechanics. Here are some of them (if the development was not initialized under a free license, the year when it moved to Open Source is mentioned in parentheses):

=== Industrial fluids ===
- Advanced Simulation Library (2015)
- Code Saturne (2007)
- FEATool Multiphysics (2013)
- OpenFOAM (2004)
- SU2 code (2012)

=== Geophysical fluids ===
- POM (1999)
- ROMS
- GOTM
- Telemac (2010, 2011 for Mascaret)
- Delft3D (2011)

== See also ==
- List of computational fluid dynamics software
