= Lacour-d'Arcenay =

- Commune
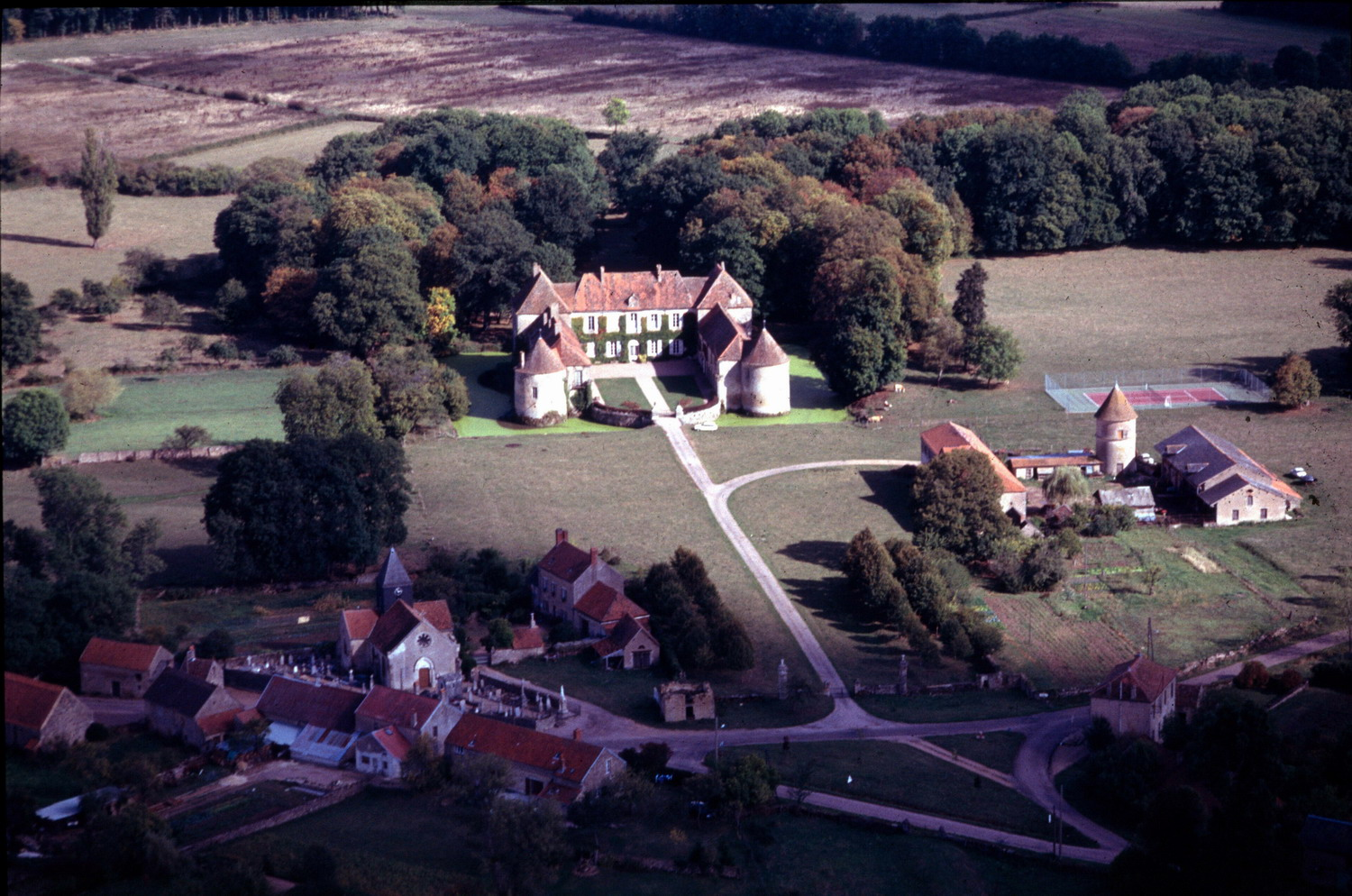
- An aerial view of Lacour
- Location of Lacour-d'Arcenay
- Location within France Location within Bourgogne-Franche-Comté
- Coordinates: 47°21′47″N 4°15′10″E
- Country: France
- Region: Bourgogne-Franche-Comté
- Department: Côte-d'Or
- Arrondissement: Montbard
- Canton: Semur-en-Auxois

Government
  - Mayor (2020–2026): Gérard Blandin
- Area^{1}: 20.24 km^{2} (7.81 sq mi)
- Elevation: 400 m (1,300 ft)
- Highest elevation: 503 m (1,650 ft)
- Lowest elevation: 355 m (1,165 ft)
- Population (2023): 109
  - Density: 5.39/km^{2} (13.9/sq mi)
- Time zone: UTC+01:00 (CET)
  - Summer (DST): UTC+02:00 (CEST)
- INSEE/Postal code: 21335 /21210
- ^{1} French Land Register data, which excludes lakes, ponds, glaciers > 1 km^{2} (0.386 sq mi or 247 acres) and river estuaries.

Lacour-d'Arcenay (French pronunciation: [lakuʁ daʁsənɛ]) is a commune in the Côte-d'Or department in eastern France.

== Population ==
Historical population
Year	Pop.	±% p.a.
1968	133	—
1975	121	−1.34%
1982	81	−5.57%
1990	87	+0.90%
1999	107	+2.33%
2007	130	+2.46%
2012	129	−0.15%
2017	122	−1.11%
2023	109	−1.86%
Source: INSEE

== See also ==
- Communes of the Côte-d'Or department
- André César Vermare Sculptor of war memorial
- Parc naturel régional du Morvan
