= Fundy Ocean Research Centre for Energy =

Tidal power test site in Nova Scotia

- Country: Canada
- Location: Minas Passage, Bay of Fundy
- Coordinates: 45°20′N 64°25′W

External links
- Website: fundyforce.ca

The Fundy Ocean Research Centre for Energy (FORCE) is a test site for tidal power in Nova Scotia, Canada. It is located at Black Rock near Parrsboro in the Minas Passage, Bay of Fundy, which has the largest tidal range in the world, and peak flows of 5 m/s (18 km/h; 11 mph; 9.7 kn).

FORCE is situated in Mi'kma'ki, the ancestral territory of the Mi’kmaq.

It is operated by a private, not-for-profit company, and has received financial support from the Government of Canada, the Province of Nova Scotia, the Offshore Energy Research Association, as well as developers aiming to test at the site. FORCE was established in 2009.

== Developers and turbines tested ==
A number of tidal turbine developers have deployed devices, or announced plans to do so at FORCE. Unfortunately, several of the companies testing have gone into administration during the process.

=== OpenHydro/Cape Sharp Tidal ===
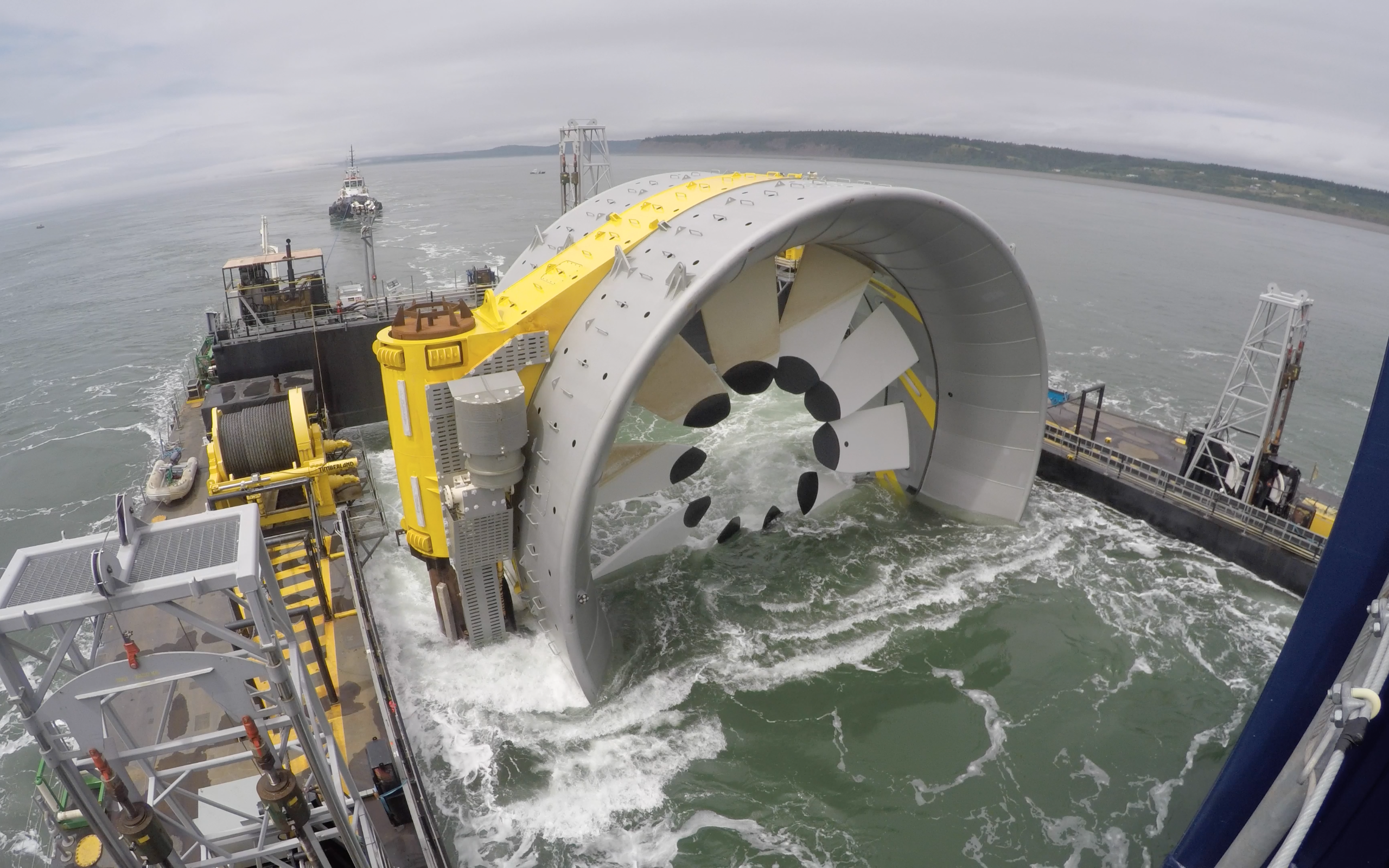
OpenHydro deployment at FORCE, July 2018

In 2009, Irish company OpenHydro was the first to install a turbine, soon after FORCE opened. A 10 m diameter, 1 MW turbine was deployed in November 2009, however it suffered serious damage to the blades just 20 days later.

In 2014, OpenHydro formed a joint venture with Emera (the parent company of Nova Scotia Power) called Cape Sharp Tidal, planning to deploy two turbines the following year. The first 2 MW grid-connected turbine was tested from November 2016 to June 2017. In July 2018, a second 2 MW grid-connected turbine was installed. This turbine was left on the seabed when OpenHydro filed for bankruptcy in 2019 suggesting it was damaged beyond repair.

=== Sustainable Marine Energy ===
In September 2018, Edinburgh-based Sustainable Marine Energy (SME) deployed their first-generation Plat-I floating tidal platform in Canada. This was not at FORCE, but in the Grand Passage channel between Long Island and Brier Island.

In 2019, SME and Minas Tidal LP agreed to co-develop adjacent berths at FORCE within the Pempa’q In-stream Tidal Energy Project. The first phase was to involve three SME floating PLAT-I devices each rated at 420 kW. The project was planned to deliver 9 MW in total, with phase one being 1.26 MW.

In April 2023, after more than 18 months of discussions, the Department of Fisheries and Oceans (DFO) authorised a limited trial of a single device for one year. However SME and its investors were uncertain DFO would ever allow a larger project, and cancelled the project. Despite providing monitoring information that showed there would be no harm to fish or other marine animals, the DFO still categorised the project as high-risk, without providing any real justification.

Shortly after their Canadian subsidiary became insolvent, Sustainable Marine Energy Ltd in the UK went into administration in August 2023.

=== BigMoon Power ===
In September 2020, Halifax-based BigMoon Power signed an agreement to test at FORCE berth D with eight 500 kW turbines. As part of this, they provided a $4.5-million security deposit to remove the OpenHydro turbine from the seabed, installed in 2018 as part of the Cape Sharp project. The company began testing their 500 kW "Falcon" turbine in fall 2022. In May 2024, BigMoon Power rebranded as Occurrent Power, however in September that year it also filed for insolvency.

=== DP Energy ===
In 2021, Irish based developer DP Energy planned to deploy six 1.5 MW Andrtiz Hammerfest Hydro turbines at FORCE in the Uisce Tapa Irish-Gaelic for "fast flowing water". This type of turbine was used at the MeyGen project in Scotland. DP Energy partnered with Chubu Electric Power Company and Kawasaki Kisen Kaisha (K Line). In 2021, the first phase of three turbines was expected to be installed "in 2023", but the project appears to have stalled.

The project secured a power purchase agreement, at a rate of $530 per MWh for 15 years, as part of Nova Scotia's Marine Renewable Energy Act. It reportedly also received a $29.75m grant from Natural Resources Canada.

=== Eauclaire Tidal ===
In December 2023, project developer Eauclaire Tidal announced they planned to deploy a 2.4 MW Orbital Marine Power O2-X turbine at FORCE, pending regulatory approvals from the Canadian Department of Fisheries and Oceans.

In November 2025, the project was expanded to include an additional two berths at FORCE, giving a total expected capacity of 16.5 MW. The electrical connection rights are accompanied by 15-year power purchase agreements with Nova Scotia Power, awarded following a competitive tendering process. Also in November, Fisheries and Oceans Canada issued authorisation under the Fisheries Act for the first three turbines to be deployed in a staged approach, starting with a single device. Following environmental monitoring and analysis, additional turbines can be added.

== See also ==
- Renewable energy in Canada
- Tidal power
- Development of tidal stream generators
