= Héaux de Bréhat Lighthouse =

Lighthouse in Côtes-d'Armor, France

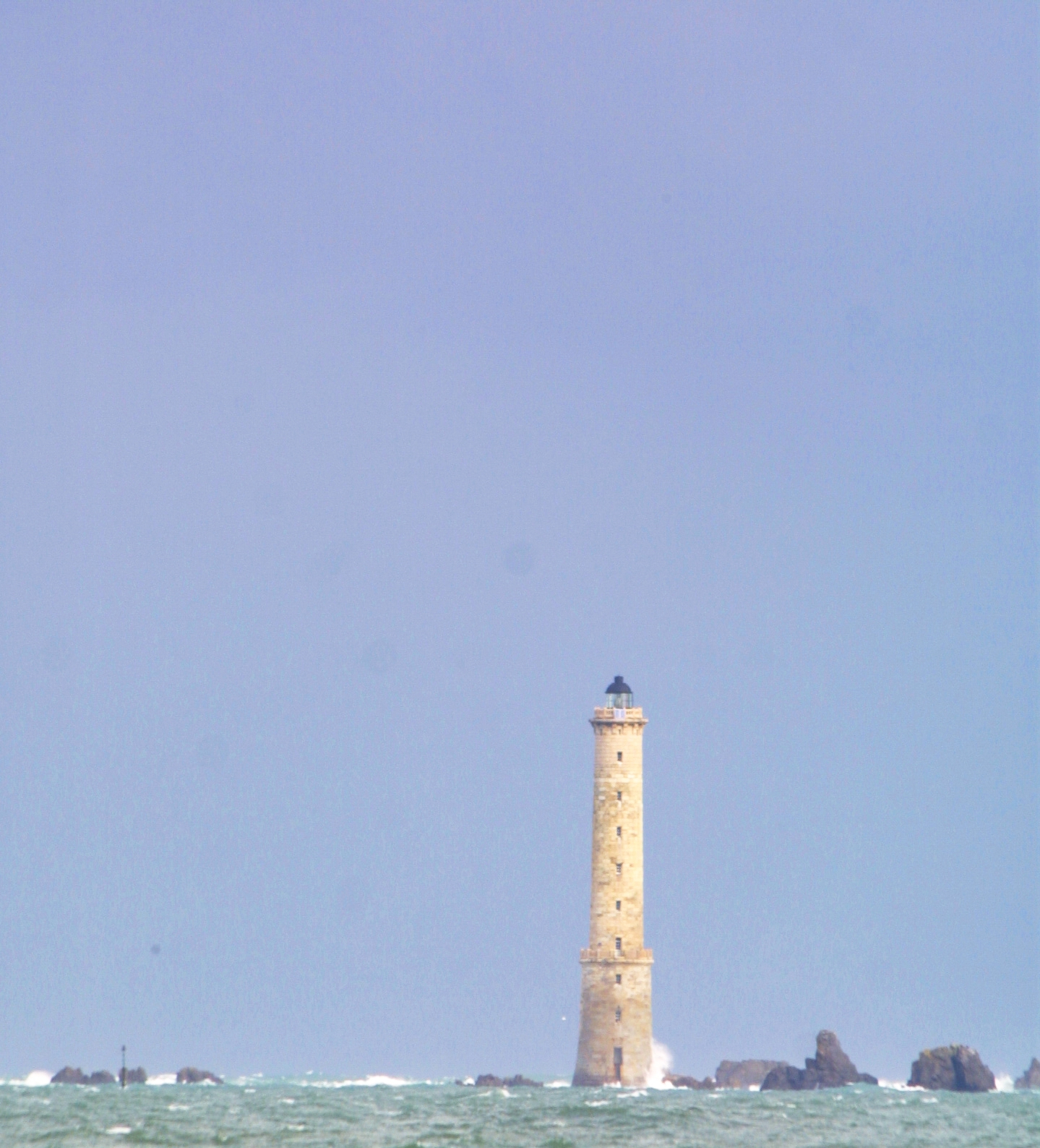
- The lighthouse in September 2006
- Location: Île-de-Bréhat, Côtes-d'Armor, France
- Coordinates: 48°54′30″N 3°05′15″W

Tower
- Constructed: 1834–1840
- Construction: stone
- Automated: 1982
- Height: 187 feet (57 m)
- Shape: round
- Heritage: classified historical monument

Light
- Focal height: 48 m (157 ft)
- Range: 15 nmi (28 km; 17 mi) (white), 11 nmi (20 km; 13 mi) (green, red)
- Characteristic: Alt. Occ. W R G 12s

The Héaux de Bréhat is an active lighthouse in Côtes-d'Armor, France, located close to the Île-de-Bréhat. The lighthouse is closed to the public.

Built by French engineer Léonce Reynaud in 1840, it sits on the reefs of Tréguier, near the Sillon de Talbert. It is on the western end of the Bay of Saint-Brieuc, and marks the entrance to the island of Bréhat from the Trieux channel.

It was classified as a monument historique on 23 May 2011.

== History ==
The French Lighthouse Commission decided to build a lighthouse on the reefs of Tréguier in 1831, entrusting the construction of a temporary structure to a carpenter from Saint-Brieuc. The project, a white signal light, was completed in 1832, but destroyed within a year due to strong currents and surf. In April 1834, Leonor Fresnel commissioned 32-year-old engineer Léonce Reynaud to design a lighthouse.

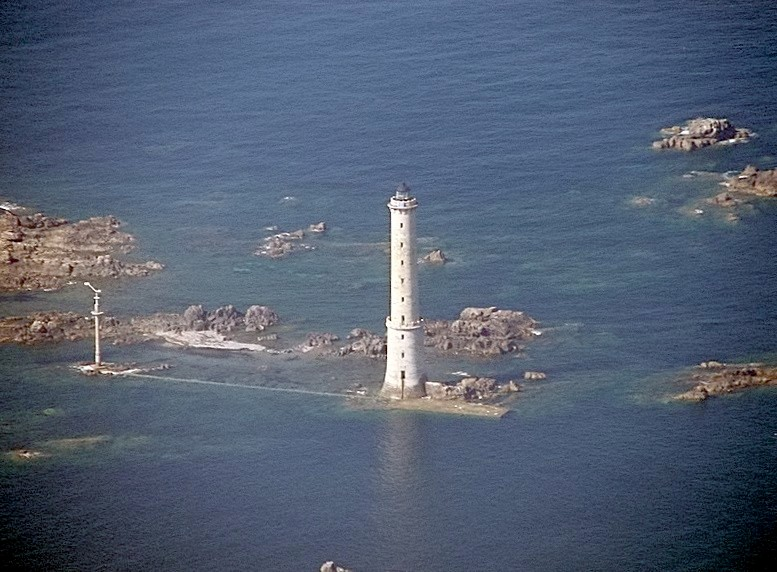
Aerial view of the lighthouse

Reynaud's approach was different, and did not fit in with the typical British-style architecture of lighthouses in 19th century Brittany. The building was constructed in two blocks: the first block was solid and modeled after the British lighthouses Eddystone and Bell Rock, while the second block was lighter in style, upon which the illumination was to be placed at its final height.

Blocks of granite were cut to size, numbered, and delivered to be assembled on site. The setbacks to construction were numerous, including several contractors backing out due to safety concerns, the proposed laying of the first stone being postponed due to bad weather, strikes shutting down the site in October 1838, and difficulties with exceeding the budget.

The light was finally lit for the first time in February 1840, with an initial height of 154 ft (47 m).

On 18 June 1903, the characteristic became white with a period of 4 seconds.

In August 1944, the Germans blew up the tower with dynamite. 49 ft (15 m) of the lighthouse disappeared into the sea, but it was quickly rebuilt and raised one floor to reach 187 ft (57 m).

The light was automated in 1982.

== Popular culture ==
The Héaux de Bréhat is featured on bottles of Glann ar Mor whisky.

The lighthouse is featured prominently in the French movie A Very Long Engagement (2004), as is the entire island of Ile de Bréhat, where the hero and heroine live. Stars include Audrey Tautou, Jodie Foster and Marion Cotillard.

== See also ==
- List of lighthouses in France
