= Saint-Saturnin-de-Lenne =

Commune in Occitanie, France

- Commune
- Coat of arms
- Location of Saint-Saturnin-de-Lenne
- Location within France Location within Occitanie
- Coordinates: 44°25′28″N 3°01′07″E
- Country: France
- Region: Occitania
- Department: Aveyron
- Arrondissement: Rodez
- Canton: Tarn et Causses

Government
  - Mayor (2020–2026): Yves Bioulac
- Area^{1}: 33.81 km^{2} (13.05 sq mi)
- Elevation: 630 m (2,070 ft)
- Highest elevation: 918 m (3,012 ft)
- Lowest elevation: 559 m (1,834 ft)
- Population (2023): 328
  - Density: 9.70/km^{2} (25.1/sq mi)
- Time zone: UTC+01:00 (CET)
  - Summer (DST): UTC+02:00 (CEST)
- INSEE/Postal code: 12247 /12560
- ^{1} French Land Register data, which excludes lakes, ponds, glaciers > 1 km^{2} (0.386 sq mi or 247 acres) and river estuaries.

Saint-Saturnin-de-Lenne (French pronunciation: [sɛ̃ satyʁnɛ̃ də lɛn]; Languedocien: Sent Adornin) is a commune in the Aveyron department in southern France.

== Population ==
Historical population
Year	Pop.	±% p.a.
1968	509	—
1975	457	−1.53%
1982	406	−1.68%
1990	379	−0.86%
1999	365	−0.42%
2007	352	−0.45%
2012	336	−0.93%
2017	295	−2.57%
2023	328	+1.78%
Source: INSEE

== See also ==
- Communes of the Aveyron department
- André César Vermare Sculptor of war memorial
