= Paimpol–Bréhat tidal farm =

Tidal turbine demonstration farm off Île-de-Bréhat near Paimpol, France

- Country: France
- Location: Off Île-de-Bréhat, near Paimpol
- Coordinates: 48°55′N 2°53′W
- Status: Under construction
- Commission date: Will not be commissioned
- Construction cost: US$55 million

Tidal power station
- Type: Tidal stream generator

Power generation
- Units operational: 0
- Make and model: DCNS
- Nameplate capacity: 1 MW; 8 MW (Planned)

The Paimpol–Bréhat tidal farm is a tidal stream turbine demonstration site, located northeast of Île-de-Bréhat near Paimpol, Brittany, France. It was initially developed by Électricité de France (EdF), initiated in 2004 and construction work began in 2008, but the project was subsequently cancelled by EdF in 2018. This project was to use OpenHydro turbines, with two briefly installed in 2016, but they were later removed.

Paimpol–Bréhat is now used as a test site, owned by EdF and managed with support from Seeneoh and Bretagne Ocean Power. In September 2022, the 2 MW three-phase AC grid connection was upgraded, allowing devices to be connected above the water without the need for divers.

The test site is about 10 km offshore and covers a rectangular area approximately 140 m × 250 m. Water depths vary across the site at 26 m to 42 m below LAT, with a tidal range of about 11.5 m. Telemac 2D modelling gives a depth averaged velocity on a medium spring tide peaks at around 2.1–2.8 m/s.

French developer HydroQuest tested a 1 MW turbine called OceanQuest at Paimpol–Bréhat between April 2019 and December 2021.

== EdF OpenHydro project (2004–2018) ==
The Paimpol–Bréhat tidal farm was initially developed by Électricité de France (EdF), starting in 2004. According to EdF, when completed it would be the world's largest tidal array and the world's first grid-connected tidal energy farm.

A 250 kW OpenHydro turbine called L’Arcouest was tested at the site between December 2013 and April 2014. This turbine was never planned to be grid connected.

The tidal farm was proposed to consist of four OpenHydro turbines, 16 m diameter and rated at 2 MW each, a total of 8 MW. The turbines were assembled by DCNS in Cherbourg and installed by OpenHydro. The first turbine was tested at sea for commissioning trials in August 2011.

The first two turbines (of a planned four) were installed in January and May 2016, but did not get connected to the grid. A 15 km long 8 MW DC export cable operating at ±5 kV was installed in 2012. To protect it from the strong currents, it is surrounded by articulated cast-iron pipe sections, with concrete mattresses added in some locations.

The two turbines were retrieved from the seabed in 2017 for replacement of components that threatened the turbine's resistance to corrosion. These turbines were never redeployed as the project was cancelled.
