= Glann ar Mor distillery =

French distillery

- Location: Pleubian, Côtes-d'Armor, Brittany, France
- Coordinates: 40°51′33″N 03°04′40″W
- Founded: 1999; 27 years ago
- Founder: Donnay family
- No. of stills: 2 onion shaped stills, direct heat (open flame), serpentine condensers
- Website: Glenn ar Mor

Glann ar Mor
- Type: Unpeated single malt

Kornog
- Type: Peated single malt

Glann ar Mor distillery is a French whisky distillery located in Pleubian, Côtes-d'Armor, Brittany.

== History ==
Glann ar Mor was created in 1997 by Celtic Whisky Compagnie, with the first single malt whisky produced in December 1999. In its present form, Glann ar Mor has been operational since June 2005, bottling its first unpeated single malt in late 2008. In November 2009, the first peated single malt (about 30-35 ppm of phenol) was sold under the brand of Kornog ("West Wind" in Breton). The distillery is located on the seafront (Glann ar Mor means "At the edge of the sea" in Breton). Bottles feature the Héaux de Bréhat Lighthouse.

== Whiskies ==
- Glann ar Mor: Unpeated single malt
- Kornog: Peated single malt
