= André César Vermare =

French sculptor

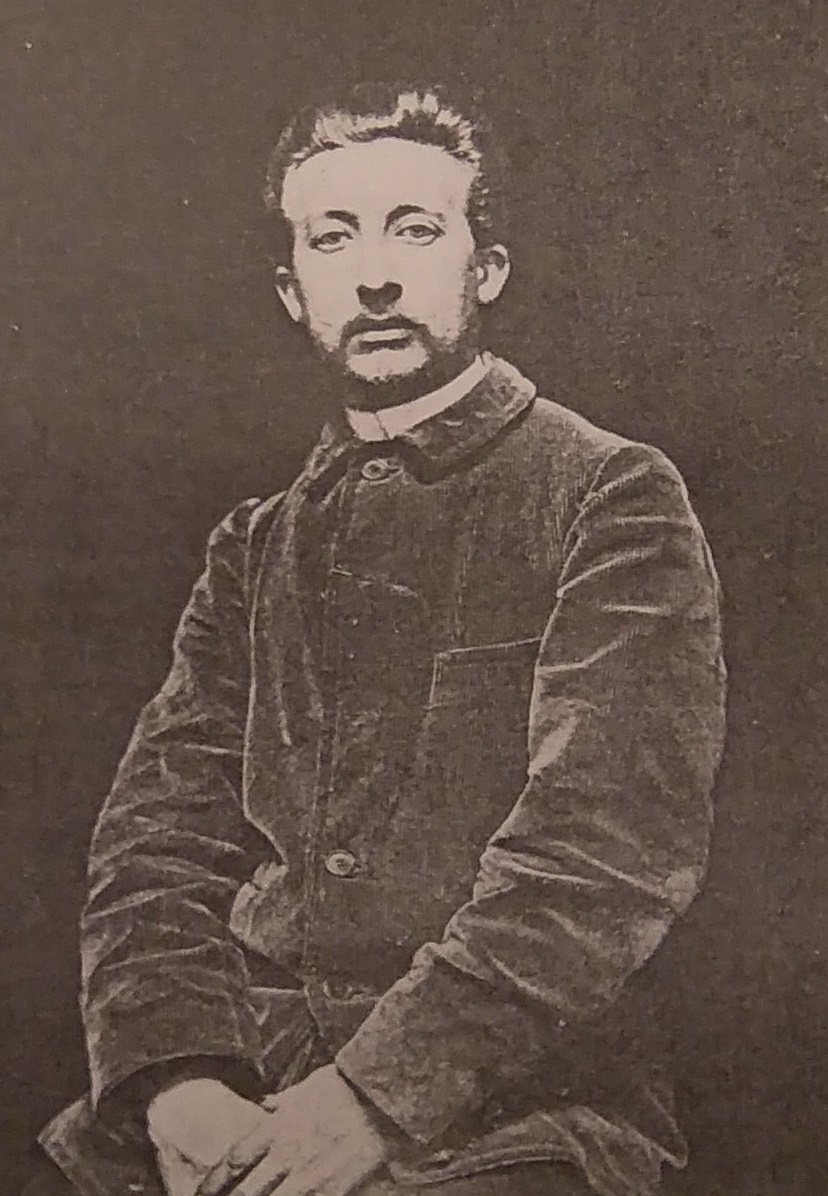
- André Vermare in 1898.
- Born: 27 November 1869; Lyon, France
- Died: 7 August 1949 (aged 79); Bréhat, France
- Education: École nationale supérieure des beaux-arts de Lyon; Beaux-Arts de Paris
- Occupation: Sculptor

André-César Vermare (27 November 1869 – 7 August 1949) was a French sculptor, known for his war memorials and monuments.

== Biography ==
Vermare was the son of the sculptor Pierre Vermare. He entered the École nationale des beaux-arts in Lyon in 1886 and studied under Charles Dufraine. In 1891 he moved up to Paris and studied there under Alexandre Falguière, Alfred-Désiré Lanson and Laurent Marqueste. 1892 saw his first submission to the Paris Salon de la Société des artistes français. He was to get an "honourable mention" and then in 1894 he carried off the "Chevavard" prize for his composition entitled Giotto enfant. 1897 saw his Orphée et Eurydice voted the runner-up in that year's Prix de Rome competition and in 1899 his La douleur d'Adam et Eve devant le cadavre d'Abel won that prestigious prize which took him to Rome's Villa Médicis from 1900 to 1903. On returning to Paris he worked with his father and created several statues for churches and as his reputation grew he received numerous commissions and received national recognition. He purchased some land and a farm at Île-de-Bréhat and built a summer house there. For many years he lived in Auteuil before retiring to Bréhat where he died on 7 August 1949. A listing of his main works, with brief details of these works, is given below.

== Main works ==
=== Giotto enfant ===
One of his earliest recorded works, this Vermare sculpture dates to 1894.

=== Monument to Marie François Sadi Carnot ===
This monument, with Vermare's sculptures of 1895 cast in bronze by the Denonvilliers foundry, is located in a public garden in Saint-Chamond, Loire. A bust of Sadi Carnot sits on top of a pedestal in front of which are two figures. One is a woman who reaches up to the bust holding a sprig of laurel and the other is a youngster, representing the metallurgical industry, who sits on an anvil and before a large metal press. Next to the woman, Vermare has placed a loom used for lace making, another local industry.

=== Eurydice menée aux enfers par Mercure ===
The Musée de beaux-arts in Lyon hold this composition in plaster which was Vermare's entry for the Prix de Rome in 1897. Vermare was the runner-up.

=== Le Christ enseignant ===
This work, dating to around 1897, was cast in bronze by the foundry Thiebaut frères.

=== La douleur d'Adam et Ève devant le cadavre d'Abel ===
Every year the Ếcole nationale supérieure des beaux-arts in Paris would set a subject for a sculptural composition and the winner was awarded the "Prix de Rome", which allowed the winner to study in Rome at the Villa Médicis. In 1899 the set subject was "La douleur d'Adam et Ève devant le cadavre d'Abel" and Vermare's submission won him the prize. The school still holds the plaster relief in their collection of the major works of ex pupils.

=== Le Rhône et la Saône ===
This relief by Vermare can be seen in Lyon's place des Cordeliers. Vermare submitted this to the Salon of 1902 and the marble version in Lyon was erected in 1907. In Poitiers there are two copies of this work in the Musée de Poitiers. One is just the head of the figure representing the Rhône. The Rhône in Vermale's composition is a muscular and naked man who is depicting swimming, seemingly against the force of the water. The Saône river is represented by a woman swimming just below the man. It is a most dramatic piece of sculpture. There is a plaster copy of Le Rhône et la Saône in Villefranche-sur-Saône's Musée Paul-Dini. There is a signature on the work showing that Vermare executed the work in 1901 whilst in Rome. It was purchased by the French state from the Salon in 1902. A 1905 marble version of Le Rhône et la Saône is held in Lyon's Chambre de commerce et d'industrie. In the photograph (figure 7) Vermare's relief can be seen between the two sets of stairs leading to the building's main entrance.

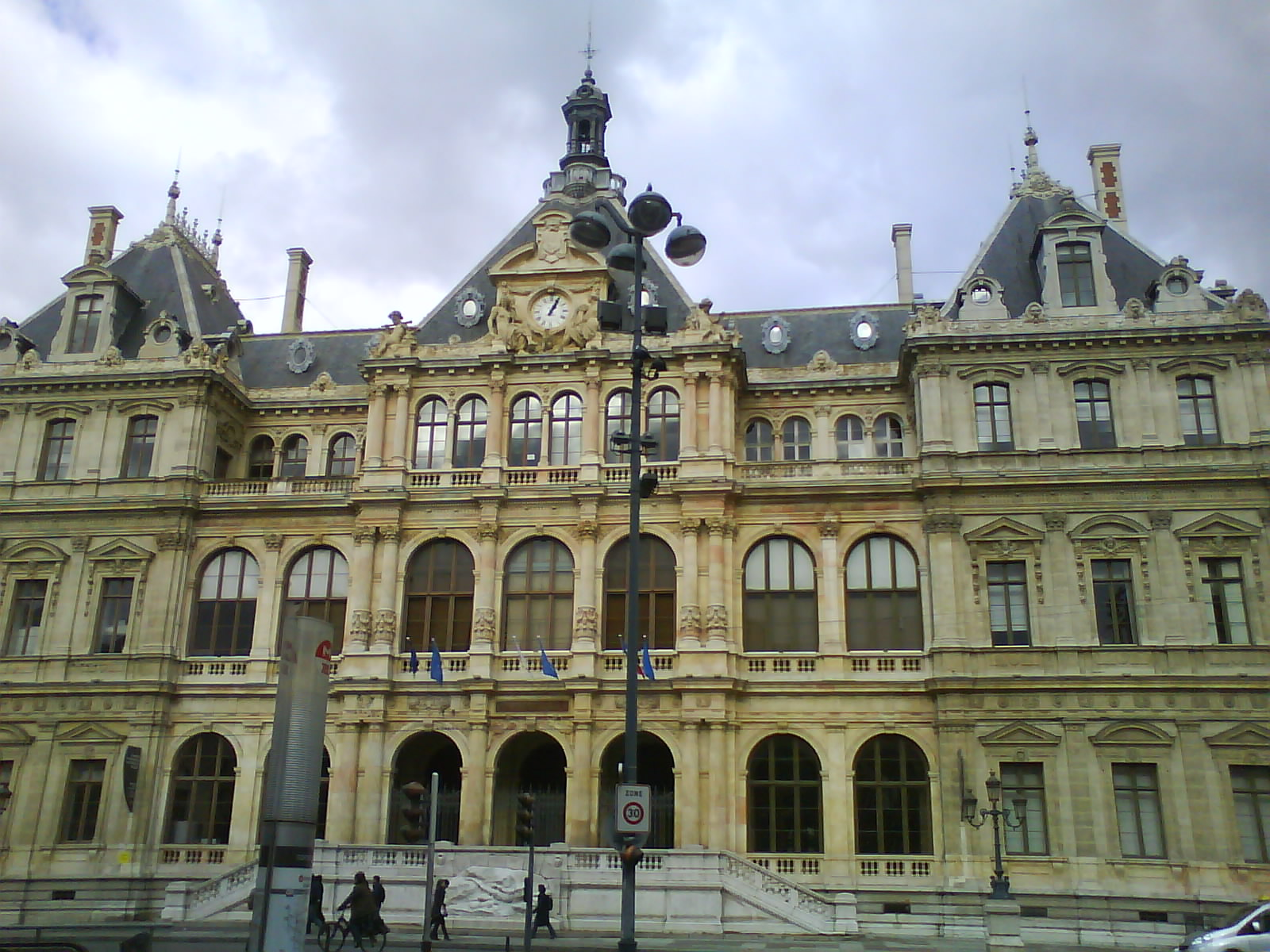
"Le Rhône et la Saône"

=== Suzanne ===
This marble study by Vermare dates to 1905 and was executed by him whilst a student in Rome. It is held by the Musée d'Orsay and the plaster version is held in Nemours at the Château-Musée. Manufacture de Sèvres also brought out an edition in biscuit. The work was shown at the 1905 Salon de la Société des artistes français. It was held in Courpalay between 1953 and 2003.

== War memorials ==
=== Monument to the 1870–1871 war ===
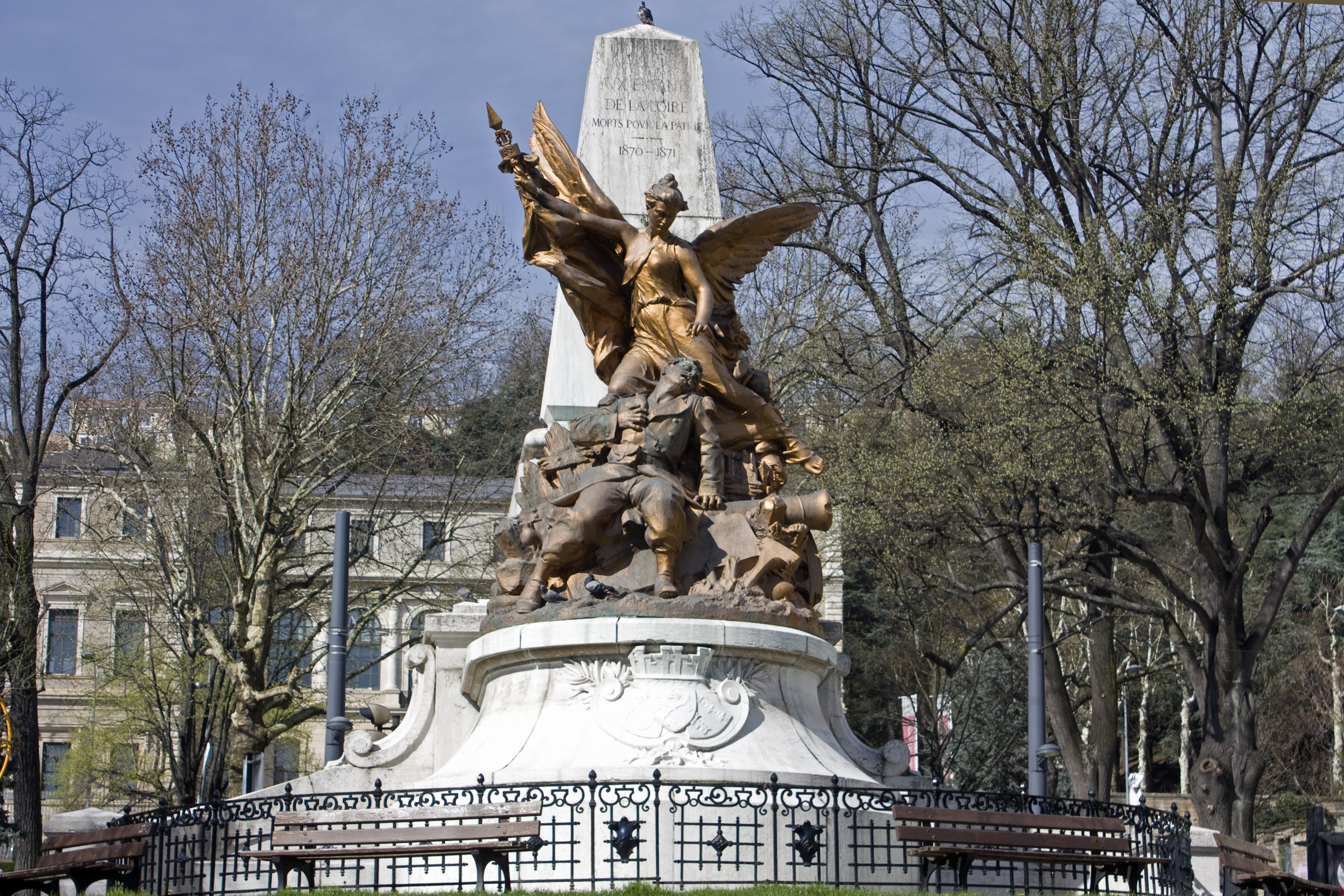
Saint Étienne.Monument to the 1870–1871 war

Vermare was the sculptor of the huge Saint Étienne monument honouring those men of the Loire region who gave their lives for France in the Franco-Prussian war. The monument was inaugurated on 29 May 1898 in the presence of the French president Félix Faure. A competition had been launched to select the architect/sculptor to be given the commission to design and erect the monument and the maquette of the architect Varinard des Côtes and Vermare, entitled Alerte, was chosen. In Vermare's composition, a winged female figure stands over the body of a soldier who has been mortally wounded and has collapsed against a canon and some broken fencing and rubble; the detritus of a battle.

=== Paimpol War Memorial ===
Now living and working in Bréhat qualified Vermare to be commissioned to add a sculpture to the Paimpol war memorial. He depicted a woman in mourning clothes looking down at the grave of a soldier who had fallen in the 1914–1918 war. The sculpture is in limestone. The inscription reads

"AUX ENFANTS DE PAIMPOL / MORTS POUR LA FRANCE / 1914 – 1918"

The woman wears the embroidered hat worn in the Trégor-Goëllo region called the "toukenn". In Goëllo the hat is worn with its points at the back whilst the women of Trégor have the points at the front thus showing which of the two regions the wearer is from. It is a Breton tradition that such hats are only embroidered on a Sunday.

=== Dol-de-Bretagne War Memorial ===
In Dol-de-Bretagne's Saint-Samson cathedral is a 1920 relief by Vermare showing Christ appearing before a kneeling soldier ("Christ apparaissant à un poilu"). The inscription reads

"A LA GLOIRE DES ENFANTS DE DOL MORTS POUR LA FRANCE; followed by a list of the dead"

=== Lacour-d'Arcenay War Memorial ===
This memorial was inaugurated on 7 May 1922 and has a bronze version of Vermare's 1909 Jeanne d'Arc au Sacre as its main feature. In 1909 Pope Pie X had declared Vermare's sculpture as the official sculpture to be used in the celebration of Joan's beautification. The sculpture was given to the Lacour-d'Arcenay commune by the comte de Lauzière whose son had died in the war.

=== Saint-Saturnin-de-Lenne War Memorial ===
This was another commune to use Vermare's Jeanne d'Arc au Sacre as the central feature of their war memorial. This memorial was inaugurated on 4 September 1921.

=== Île de Bréhat War Memorial ===
This 1920 memorial to the dead of the 1914–1918 war is kept in the Église paroissiale Notre-Dame. It comprises four stele. Three of these list the names of the dead and those who died in the 1939–1945 conflict. A fourth stele has a bas-relief depicting a widow at prayer at the foot of a cross of Saint-Maudez. She wears mourning dress. The names of the main battles of the 1914–1918 are also listed. The stele are inscribed

"ILS ONT ETE LE SALUT ET L'HONNEUR DE LA PATRIE MORTS AU CHAMP D'HONNEUR MORTS SOUS LES DRAPEAUX 1914–1918; A NOS MORTS POUR LA FRANCE 1939 – 1945"

=== The Monument aux Diables Bleus ===
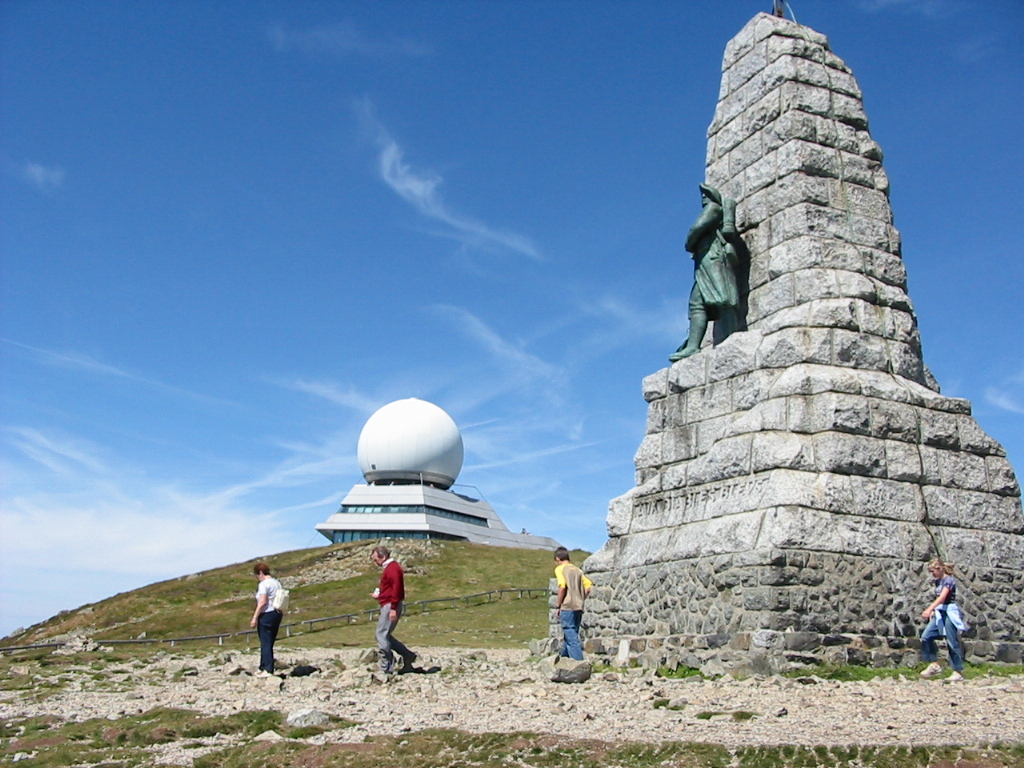
Monument aux Diables Bleus

This monument stands at the top of the "ballon de Guebwiller" ("Le Grand Ballon") in the Vosges at a height of 1424 mètres. The monument comprises a pyramid made from the red granite of the Vosges which had a bronze depiction of a "Chasseur Alpin" sculpted by Vermare and fellow sculptor Moreau Vautier. The inauguration took place on 25 September 1927. In 1940 the bronze was taken by the German Army and in 1960 the sculptor Bouret recreated this statue.

== Other monuments and sculptures ==
=== Monument to Cardinal Elzéar-Alexandre Taschereau ===
This monument is located in Québec facing the town hall and the Basilica Notre-dame de Québec and honours the first Canadian cardinal. Vermare created the statue of the cardinal, four cherubs and three bas-reliefs, all in bronze. The inauguration took place on 9 June 1923. Vermare sculpted the cardinal standing dressed in a rochet and wearing the cappa magna. His right hand is raised and his left hand rests on his chest. The three reliefs depict episodes in Taschereau's life. In one he is shown in the Basilica kneeling in prayer before the altar, in another he is shown in a seminary reminding us of his academic life and that he had served as the rector of Laval university. The third recalls Taschereau's risking his life in helping Irish victims of the 1847 outbreak of typhus.

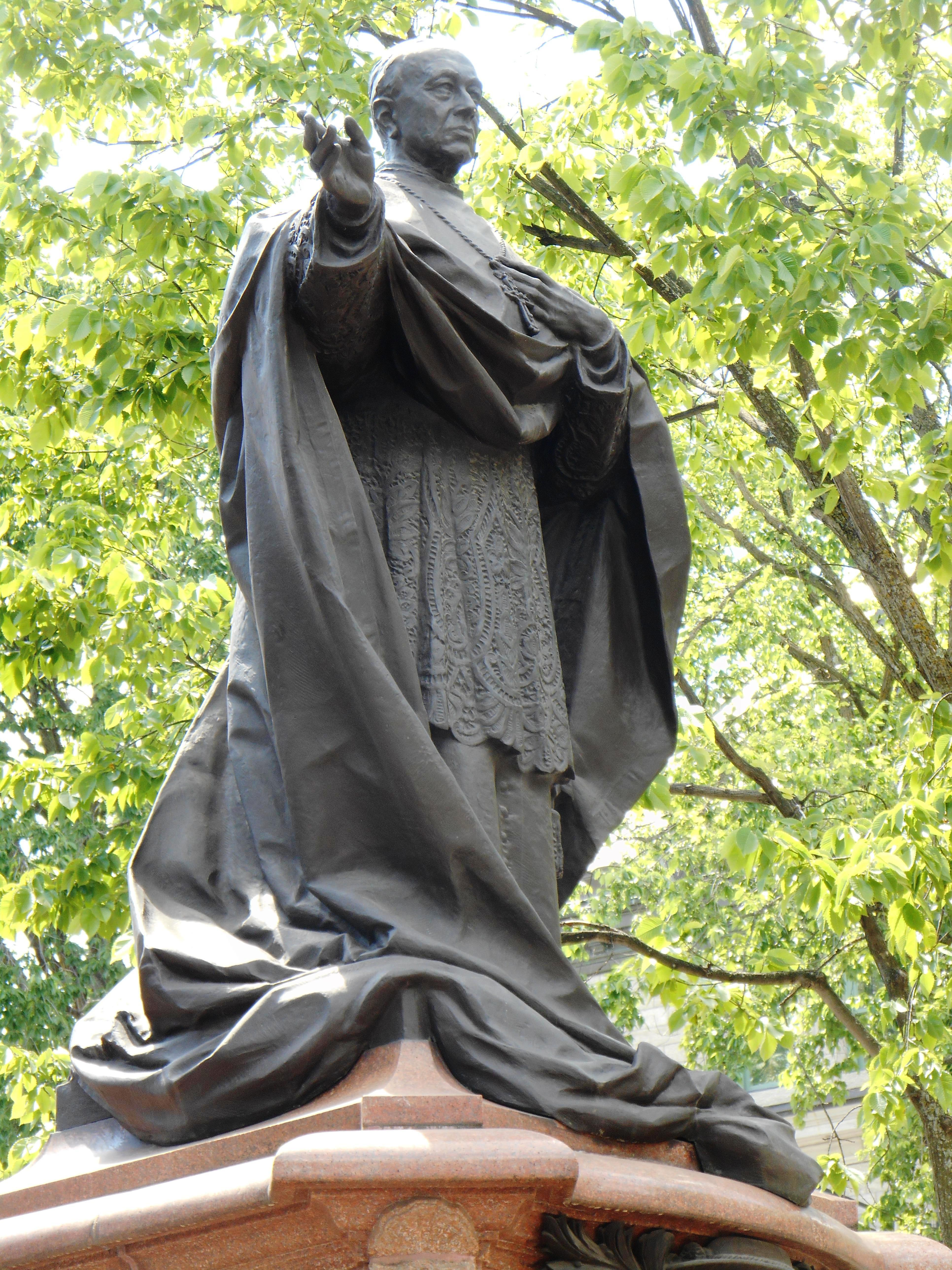
Vermare's statue of Cardinal Elzéar-Alexandre Taschereau

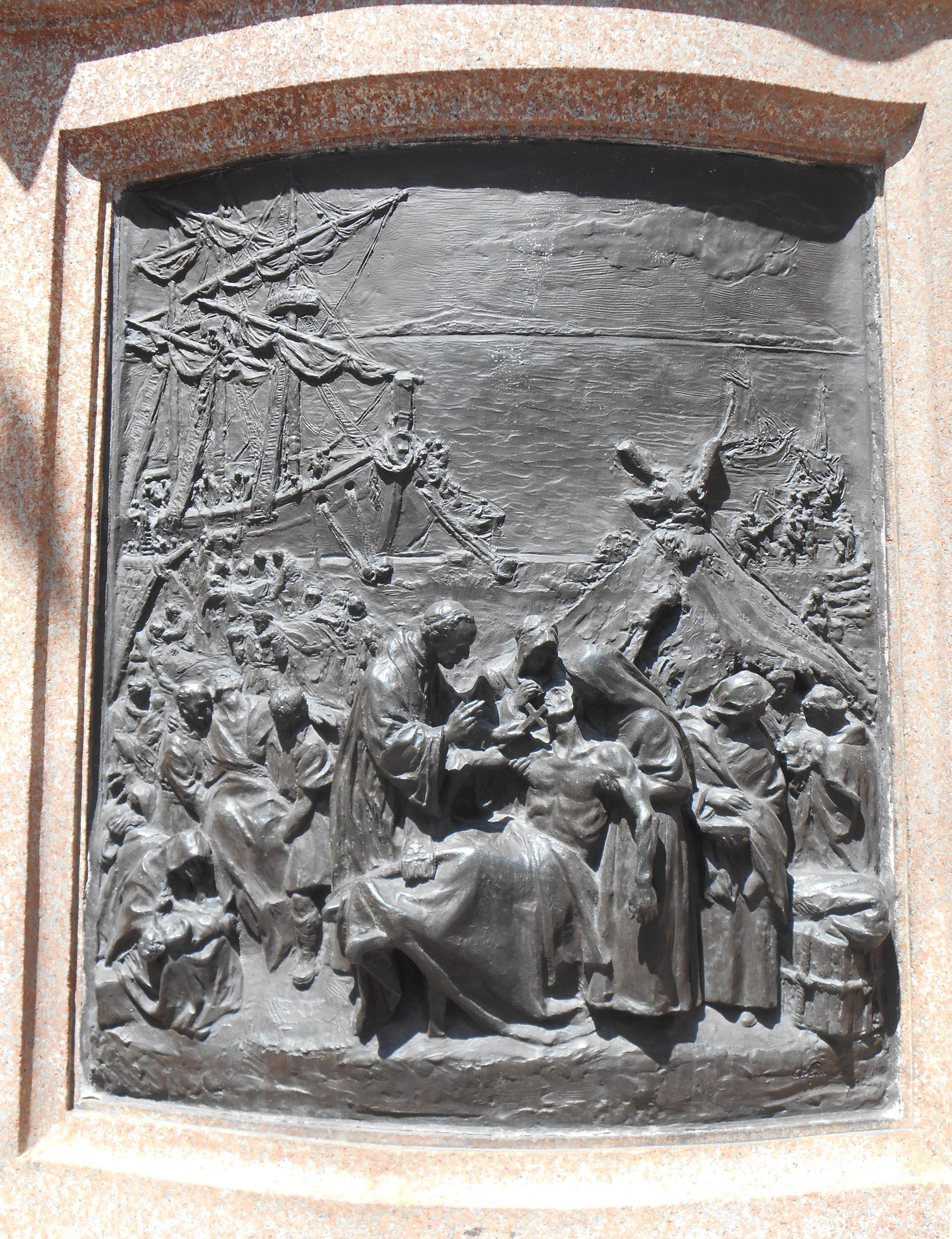
Taschereau shown as a missionary helping Irish refugees.

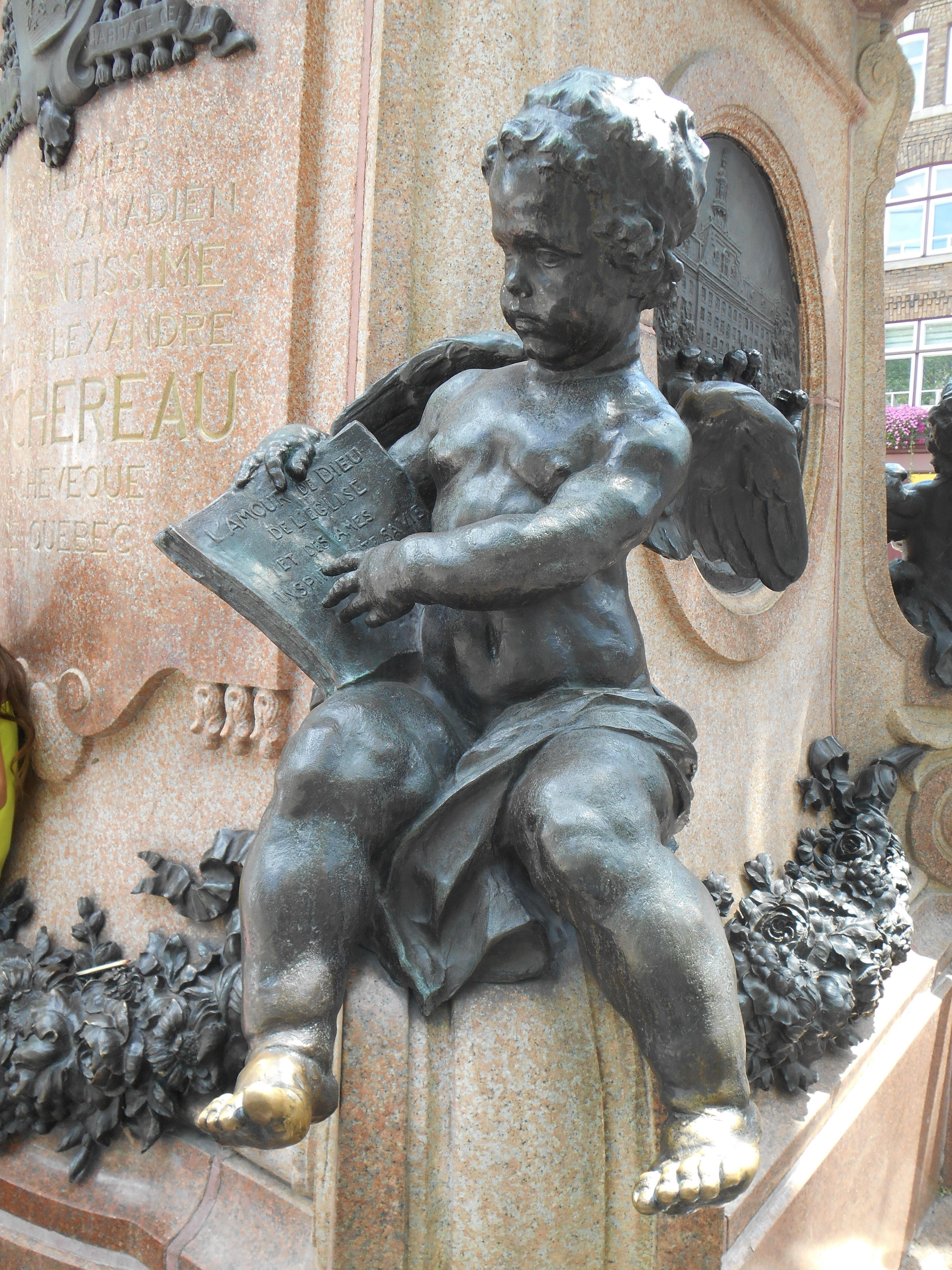
One of the four cherubs.

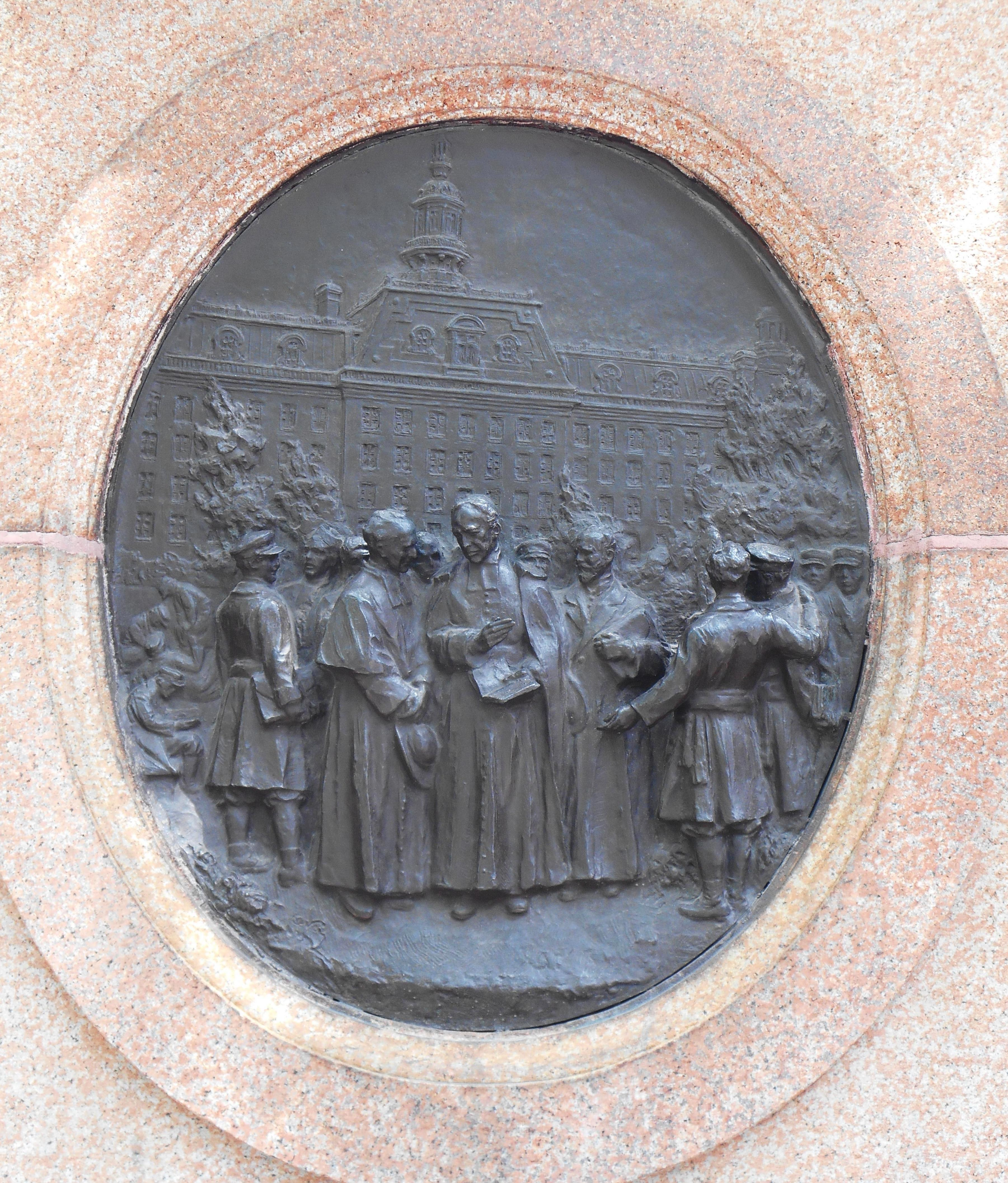
Taschereau amongst fellow seminarians.

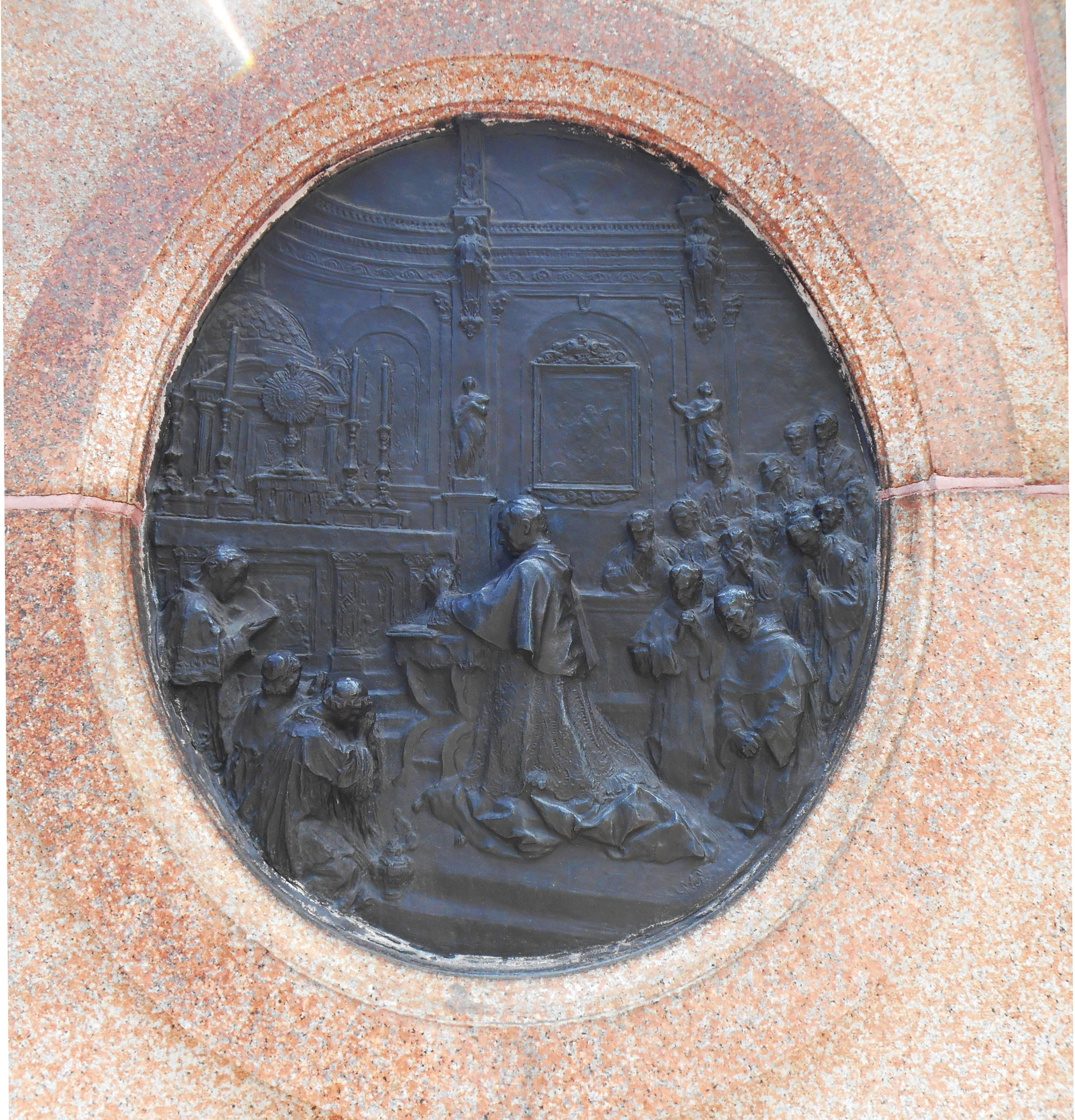
Taschereau praying in the basilica

=== Monument to Antoine Gailleton ===
This eminent surgeon had been the mayor of Lyon and this elaborate monument in the place Gailleton was erected in his honour in 1913. Sadly Vermare's bust on this monument fell foul of the occupying German's thirst for metals and was melted down in 1942. In 1959, the bust was replaced but in stone and the area around the monument converted to a fountain in 2005. There are two Vermare bas-reliefs on the monument. One represents Science and shows the university being built whilst the other was entitled Progress.

=== Medallion depicting Ernest Marché ===
Ernest Marché was a Nemours born painter and curator of the Musée de Nemours from 1911 to 1932. This 1933 medallion depicting Marché is held in that museum's collection.

=== Bust of André-Marie Ampère ===
This Vermare work is held in the Lyon Musée de beaux-arts. It was in August 1906 that the "Association pour l'avancement des sciences" set up a committee to organise the erection of a statue of Ampère at Poleymieux-au-Mont-d'Or and gave the commission to Vermare. The maquette was shown at the 1909 Paris Salon and although the final work was finished in 1912 it was not inaugurated until 1921, the delay being caused by the war.

=== Monument to Brillat-Savarin ===
This monument in Belley featured sculpture by Vermare which had been cast in bronze in 1927. The pedestal was inscribed

" A BRILLAT-SAVARIN / AUTEUR DE LA PHYSIOLOGIE DU GOUT / 1755–1826 / CONVIER QUELQU’UN C’EST SE CHARGER DE SON BONHEUR PENDANT TOUT LE TEMPS QU'IL EST SOUS NOTRE TOIT"

During the German occupation the bronze was removed and melted down for re-use. Fortunately Vermale had kept the original model so in 1948 a new casting was made in bronze and a second inauguration took place.

=== Bust of Paul Guadet ===
Vermare's 1928 bust of the French architect is held in Besançon's Lycée polyvalent Jules Haag.

=== Georges Wague ===
Vermare created a sculpture depicting this actor playing the role of pierrot. He also executed a bust of Wague.

=== Après la faute ===
This composition in plaster dates to 1894.

=== Statues of Joan of Arc and Sainte Bernadette Soubirous ===
These two Vermare works in plaster in Saint-Pé-de-Bigorre. Sainte Bernadette Soubirous is depicted at the moment of her vision at the Lourdes grotto and is dressed as a shepherdess.

=== Adam et Eve ===
A work dating to 1897.

=== Bas-relief in Paris 14th Arrondissement ===
At 3 rue Cassini there is a bas-relief by Vermare. The building was designed by the architect F.Saulnier in 1908/1909. In Vemare's composition a young boy plays a lute listened to by two young girls who carry bunches of flowers.

== Vermare work in churches ==
=== Statue of St Elisabeth ===
This statue is located in the Saint-M'Hervé Église paroissiale Saint-Eloi.

=== Statues to the Curé d'Ars John Vianney ===
There are several Vermare bronzes in French churches depicting Vianney, including Châtillon's maison de retraite Sainte-Anne d'Auray in the rue de Fontenay. It is only 0.60 metres high and on a marble base. It depicts John Vianney (Jean-Baptiste-Marie Vianney) at prayer. There is another statue of the curé d'Ars in Grillon's église paroissiale Sainte-Agathe and another in the Frans townhall. There is a copy in the Sainte-Addresse church in Bellerive-sur-Allier, The original marble work is in a side chapel of Lyon's primatiale Saint-Jean and was created in 1905 on the occasion of Vianney's beautification. Pope Pius X had a reproduction of the sculpture in his office.

== Joan of Arc ==
=== Jeanne au Sacre ===
This depiction of Joan of Arc is a well-known Vermare work. The original marble sculpture was executed in 1909 for the Église St-Louis des Français in Rome as part of the celebrations for Joan of Arc's beautification in that year, the use of Vermare's work being officially approved by Pope Pie X. Many copies of this work were made by various commercial enterprises, these in plaster, bronze and cast iron. An example of the sculpture can be seen for example in Machecoul's Église de La Trinité . Joan is depicted at the coronation of Charles V11 in Reims on 17 July 1429.

=== Cathédrale Sainte-Croix ===
This cathedral in Orléans has a later statue of Joan by Vermare dating to 1912, this located in the Sainte Jeanne d'Arc chapel.

=== Église paroissiale Saint-François-d'Assise ===
This church in Beauregard has a statue of Joan of Arc by Vermare.

== Miscellaneous ==
Vermare participated in adding to the decoration of many churches and apart from those works covered in the above notes, his work can be seen in churches in Saugnacq-et-Muret, Sail-sous-Couzan, Réauville and in the parish church of Saint-Julien in Le Havre. He also executed several small bronze pieces including Jeune Homme (35 cm), ête masculine (31 cm) and Pierrot déclamant, and Sèvres brought out a biscuit piece entitled Jeune fille au bouc.
