= Île-de-Bréhat =

Bréhat Île-de-Bréhat Enez-Vriad
- Commune
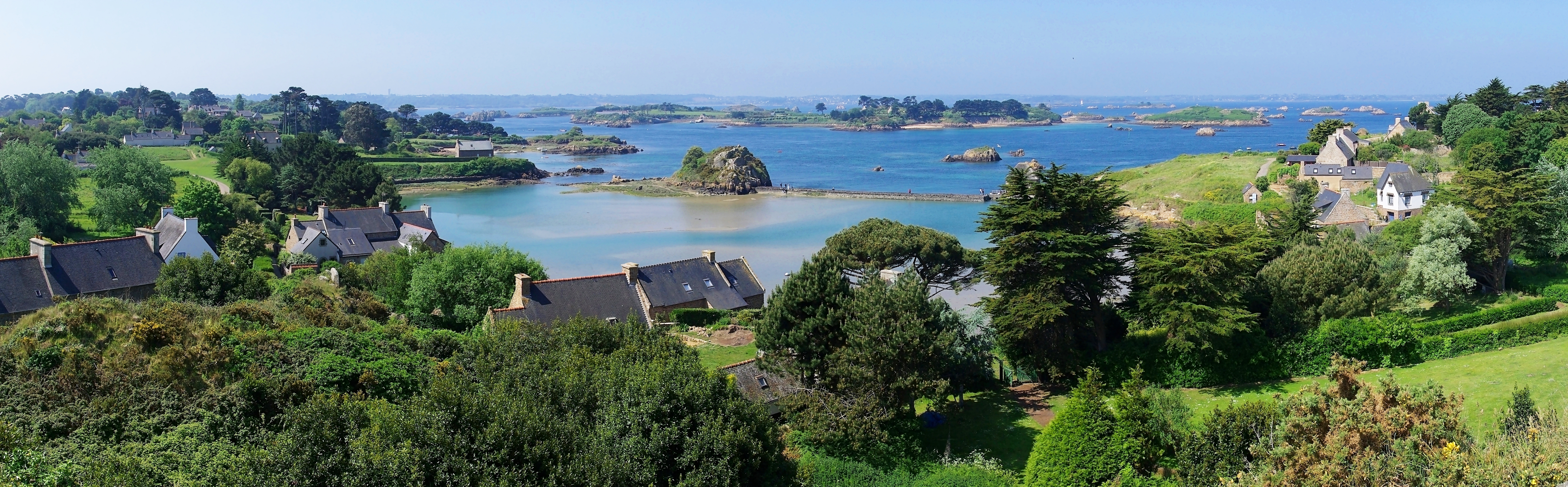
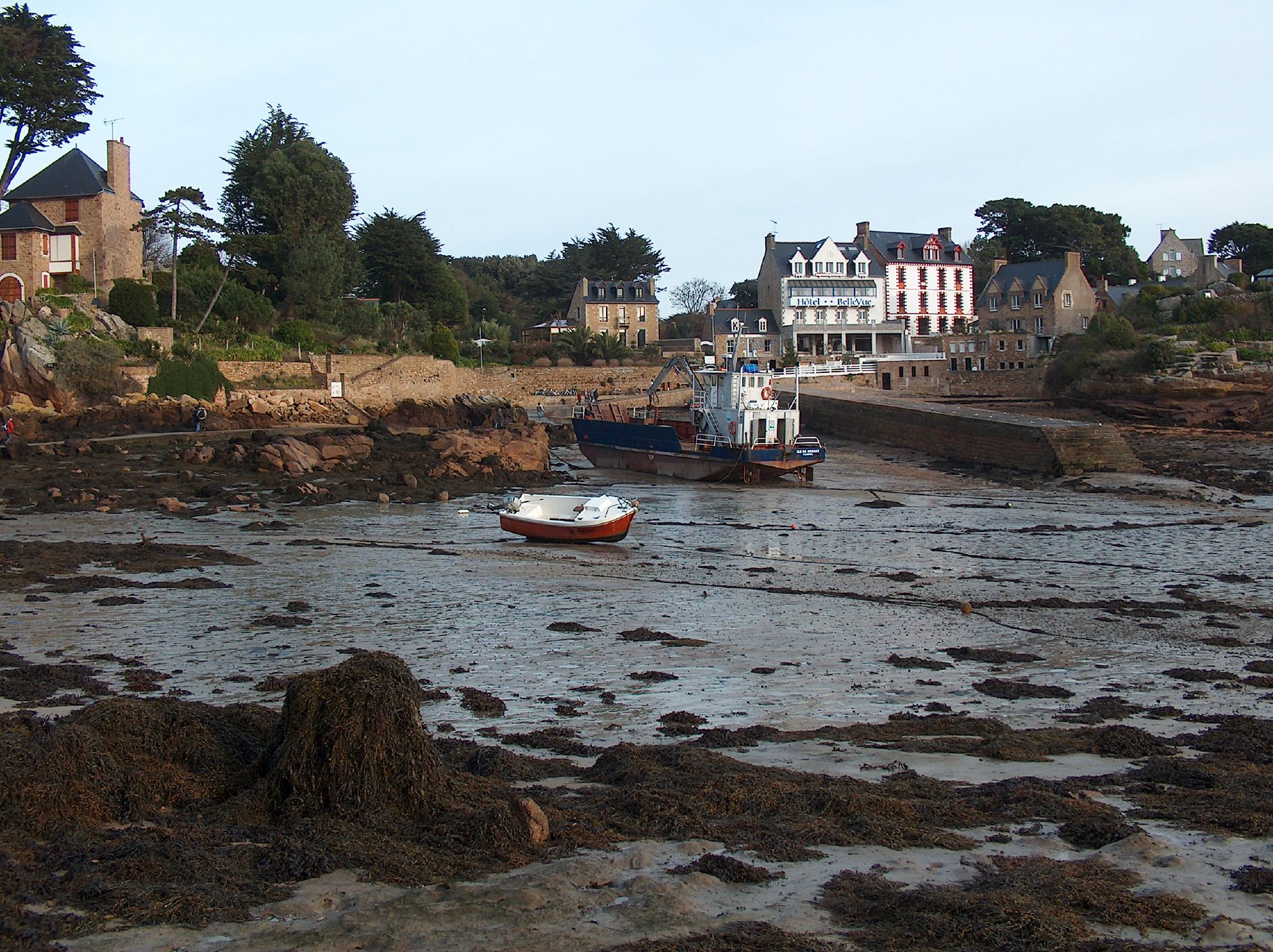
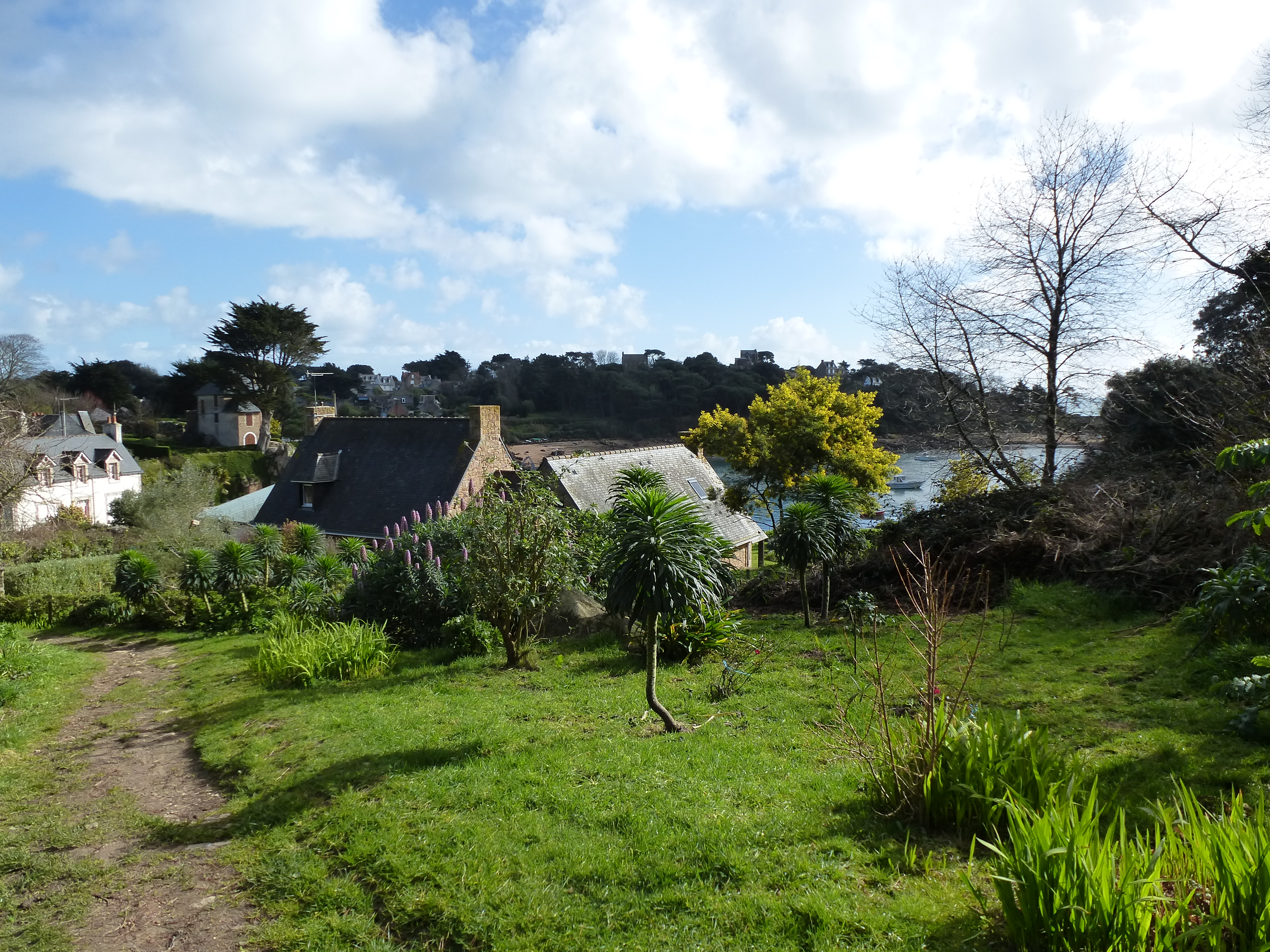
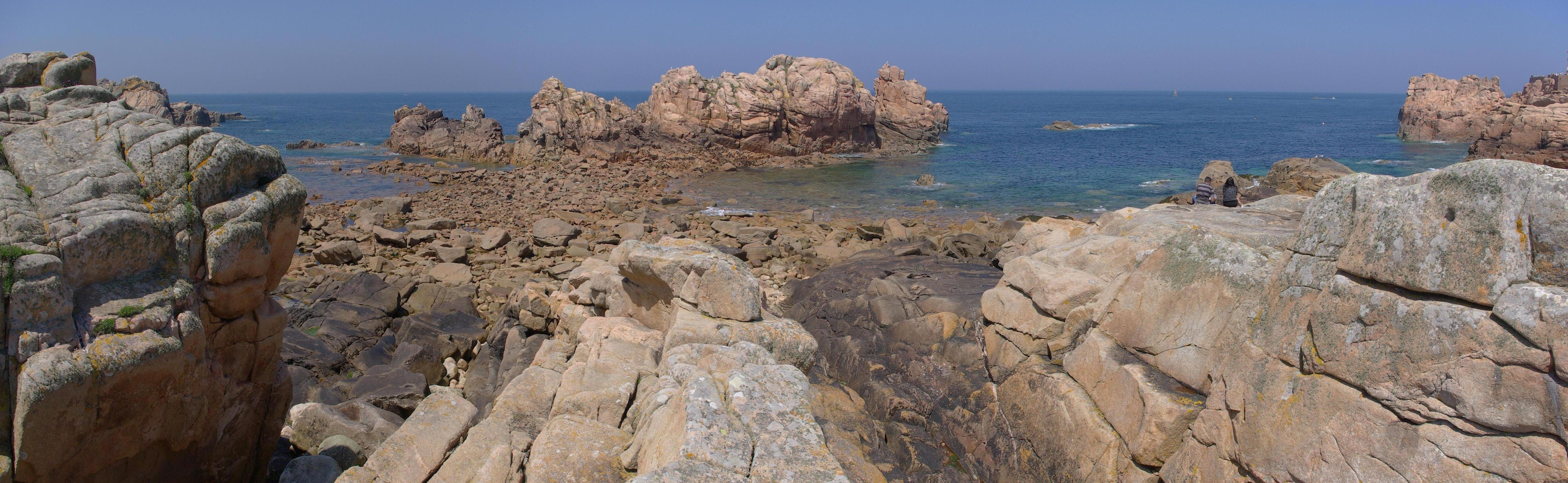
- Views of Bréhat

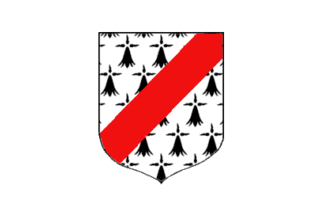
- Flag Coat of arms
- Location of Bréhat
- Location within France Location within Brittany
- Coordinates: 48°50′51″N 3°00′00″W
- Country: France
- Region: Brittany
- Department: Côtes-d'Armor
- Arrondissement: Saint-Brieuc
- Canton: Paimpol

Government
  - Mayor (2020–2026): Olivier Carré
- Area^{1}: 3.09 km^{2} (1.19 sq mi)
- Highest elevation: 34 m (112 ft)
- Lowest elevation: 0 m (0 ft)
- Population (2023): 429
  - Density: 139/km^{2} (360/sq mi)
- Time zone: UTC+01:00 (CET)
  - Summer (DST): UTC+02:00 (CEST)
- INSEE/Postal code: 22016 /22870
- Website: www.iledebrehat.fr
- ^{1} French Land Register data, which excludes lakes, ponds, glaciers > 1 km^{2} (0.386 sq mi or 247 acres) and river estuaries.

Bréhat (French: Île-de-Bréhat, French pronunciation: [il də bʁea]; Breton: Enez Vriad) is an island and commune located near Paimpol, a mile off the northern coast of Brittany. Administratively, it is a commune in the Côtes-d'Armor department in northwestern France.

Bréhat is actually an archipelago composed of two main islands, separated only at high tide, and many smaller ones. It is famous for its pink granite rocks, very mild micro-climate and Mediterranean vegetation, due to the warm Gulf Stream coming from across the Atlantic.

Many day-trippers come to Bréhat every day by the ferry service (les Vedettes de Bréhat) which sails from Pointe de l'Arcouest, to the north of Paimpol, taking about 10 minutes. They come to visit the main tourist attractions, the Paon and Rosedo lighthouses, the St-Michel chapel, the Guerzido beach, the Birlot [fr] water-mill and the Verrerie of Bréhat. In June 2023 the local municipality imposed a limit on the numbers of summer tourists, citing "overtourism".

Other than tractors, the sightseeing road train, and a few essential professional vehicles, there are no motor vehicles on Bréhat.

== Climate ==
Bréhat features a temperate oceanic climate with mild winters, dry summers and lower precipitation levels than continental Brittany as a result of the effects of the Gulf Stream, favoring a wide diversity of plants and flowers such as mimosas, hortensias, ceanothus, echiums and agapanthus. It is one of the few places in Brittany and its surroundings where palm trees and other Mediterranean plants can grow naturally due to the scarcity of frosts throughout the year.

Climate data for Ile de Brehat (1991-2020 averages, records 1921-)
Month	Jan	Feb	Mar	Apr	May	Jun	Jul	Aug	Sep	Oct	Nov	Dec	Year
Record high °C (°F)	17.5 (63.5)	20.7 (69.3)	21.0 (69.8)	23.5 (74.3)	27.8 (82.0)	31.1 (88.0)	31.6 (88.9)	31.9 (89.4)	34.0 (93.2)	28.2 (82.8)	21.0 (69.8)	18.7 (65.7)	34.0 (93.2)
Mean daily maximum °C (°F)	9.9 (49.8)	10.1 (50.2)	11.6 (52.9)	13.4 (56.1)	15.9 (60.6)	18.5 (65.3)	20.6 (69.1)	21.1 (70.0)	19.6 (67.3)	16.6 (61.9)	13.0 (55.4)	10.6 (51.1)	15.1 (59.2)
Daily mean °C (°F)	7.9 (46.2)	7.9 (46.2)	9.1 (48.4)	10.6 (51.1)	13.1 (55.6)	15.6 (60.1)	17.6 (63.7)	18.2 (64.8)	16.8 (62.2)	14.2 (57.6)	10.9 (51.6)	8.6 (47.5)	12.5 (54.5)
Mean daily minimum °C (°F)	5.8 (42.4)	5.6 (42.1)	6.5 (43.7)	7.7 (45.9)	10.2 (50.4)	12.7 (54.9)	14.6 (58.3)	15.2 (59.4)	14.1 (57.4)	11.8 (53.2)	8.9 (48.0)	6.6 (43.9)	10.0 (50.0)
Record low °C (°F)	−9.0 (15.8)	−6.7 (19.9)	−3.0 (26.6)	0.3 (32.5)	2.1 (35.8)	5.2 (41.4)	8.0 (46.4)	4.0 (39.2)	6.0 (42.8)	0.0 (32.0)	−3.0 (26.6)	−7.2 (19.0)	−9.0 (15.8)
Average precipitation mm (inches)	75.0 (2.95)	67.2 (2.65)	54.7 (2.15)	56.5 (2.22)	51.4 (2.02)	43.9 (1.73)	42.8 (1.69)	51.9 (2.04)	44.0 (1.73)	82.7 (3.26)	91.4 (3.60)	99.0 (3.90)	760.5 (29.94)
Average precipitation days (≥ 1.0 mm)	13.5	12.8	10.2	10.7	8.7	7.6	8.0	7.5	8.1	12.8	15.1	15.3	130.4
Source: Meteociel

== Population ==
Historical population
Year	Pop.	±% p.a.
1968	653	—
1975	553	−2.35%
1982	511	−1.12%
1990	461	−1.28%
1999	421	−1.00%
2007	439	+0.52%
2012	404	−1.65%
2017	361	−2.23%
2023	429	+2.92%
Source: INSEE

Inhabitants of Île-de-Bréhat are called Bréhatins in French.

== Sights ==
- Héaux de Bréhat Lighthouse
- Rosedo Lighthouse
- Chapelle Saint Michel
- Paon Lighthouse
- Chapelle Keranroux
- Verrerie of Brehat
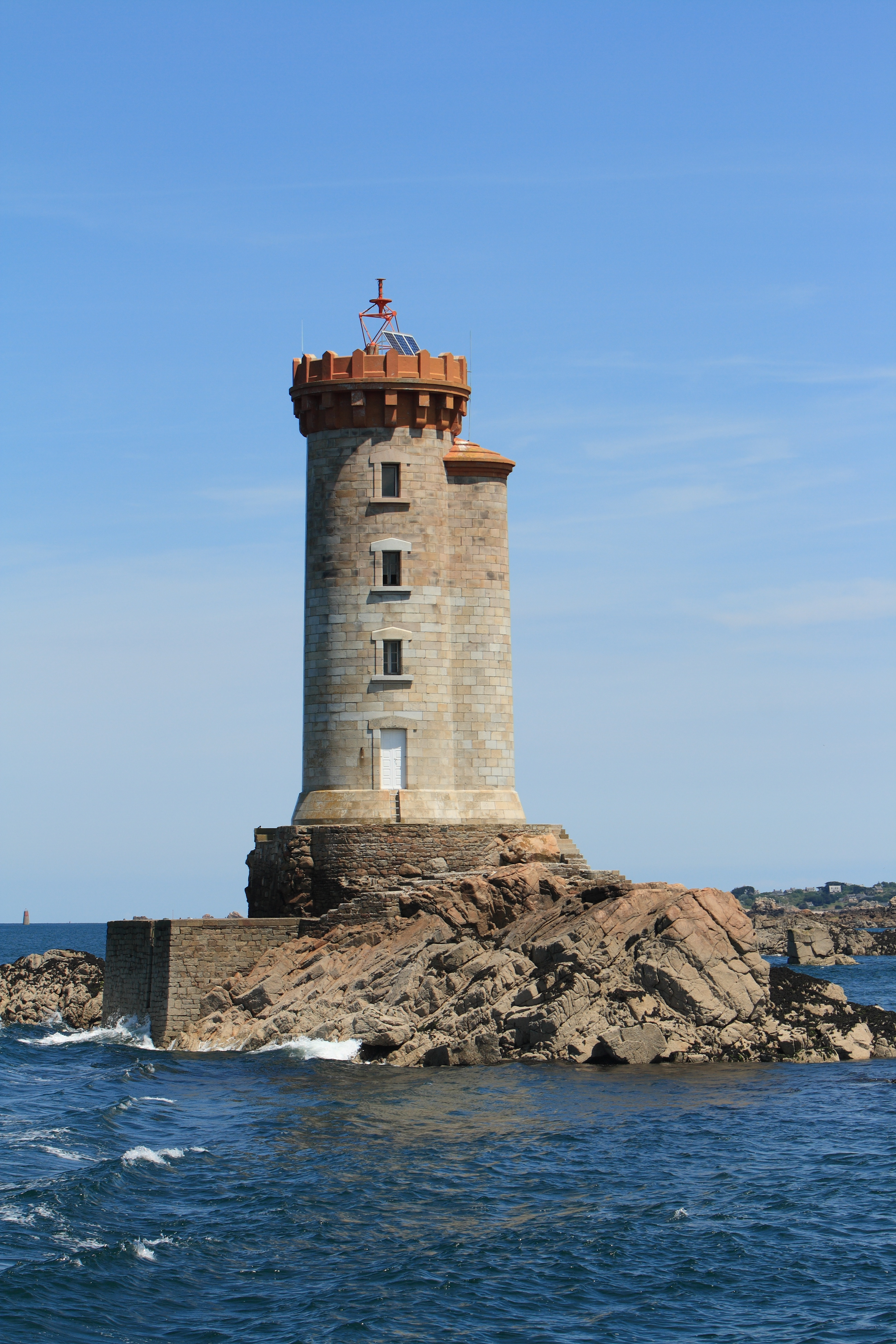
La Croix Lighthouse

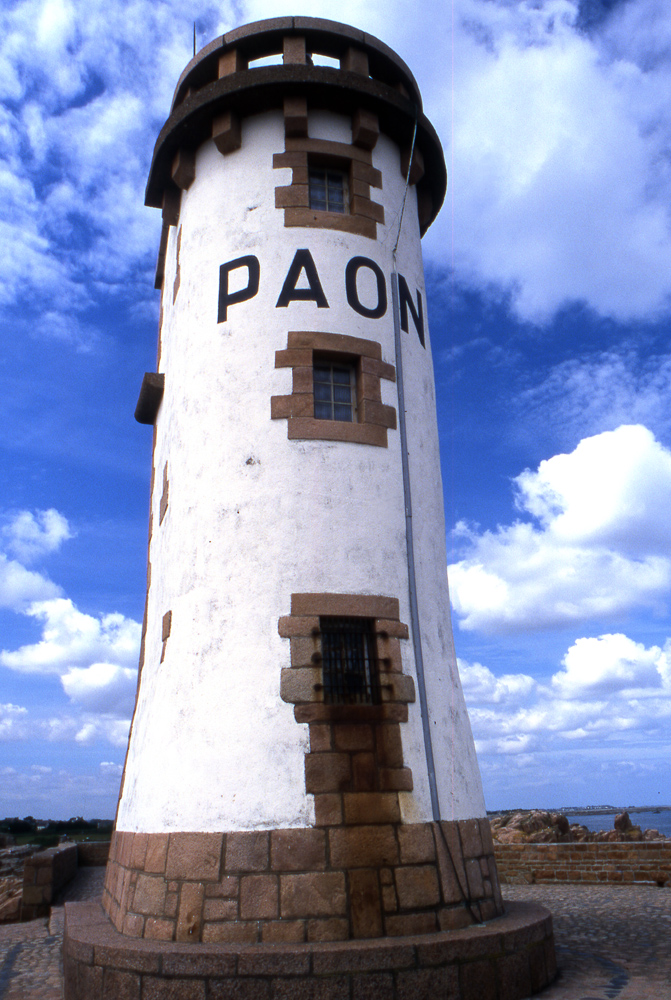
Paon Lighthouse

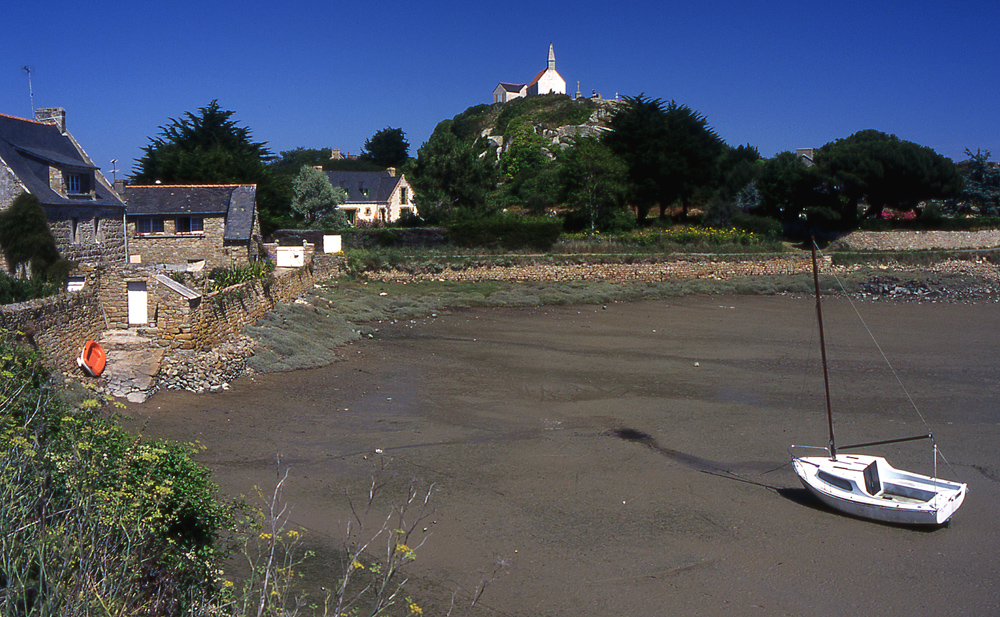
Chapelle St Michel

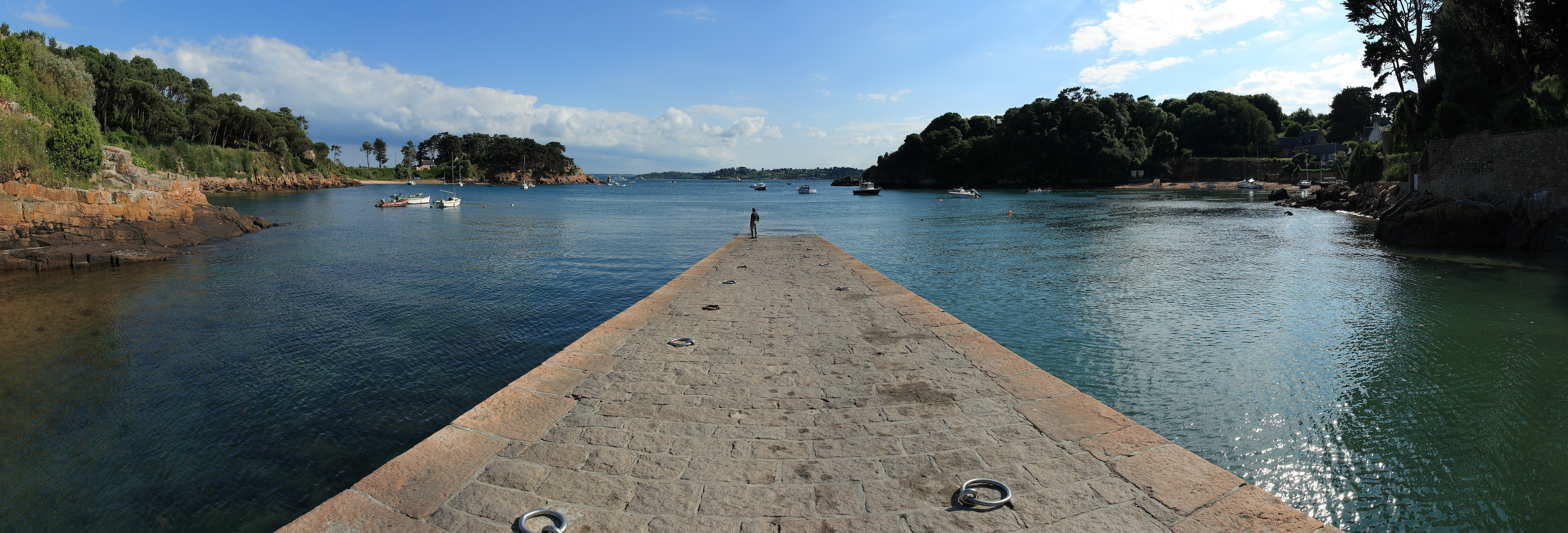
Bréhat island's enclosed harbour, at high tide

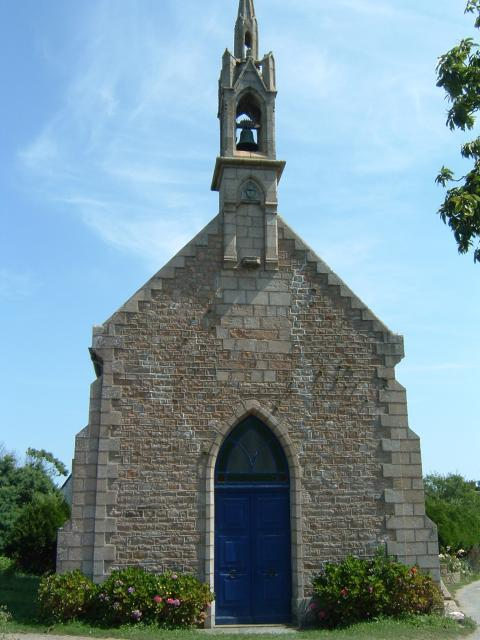
Chapelle Keranoux

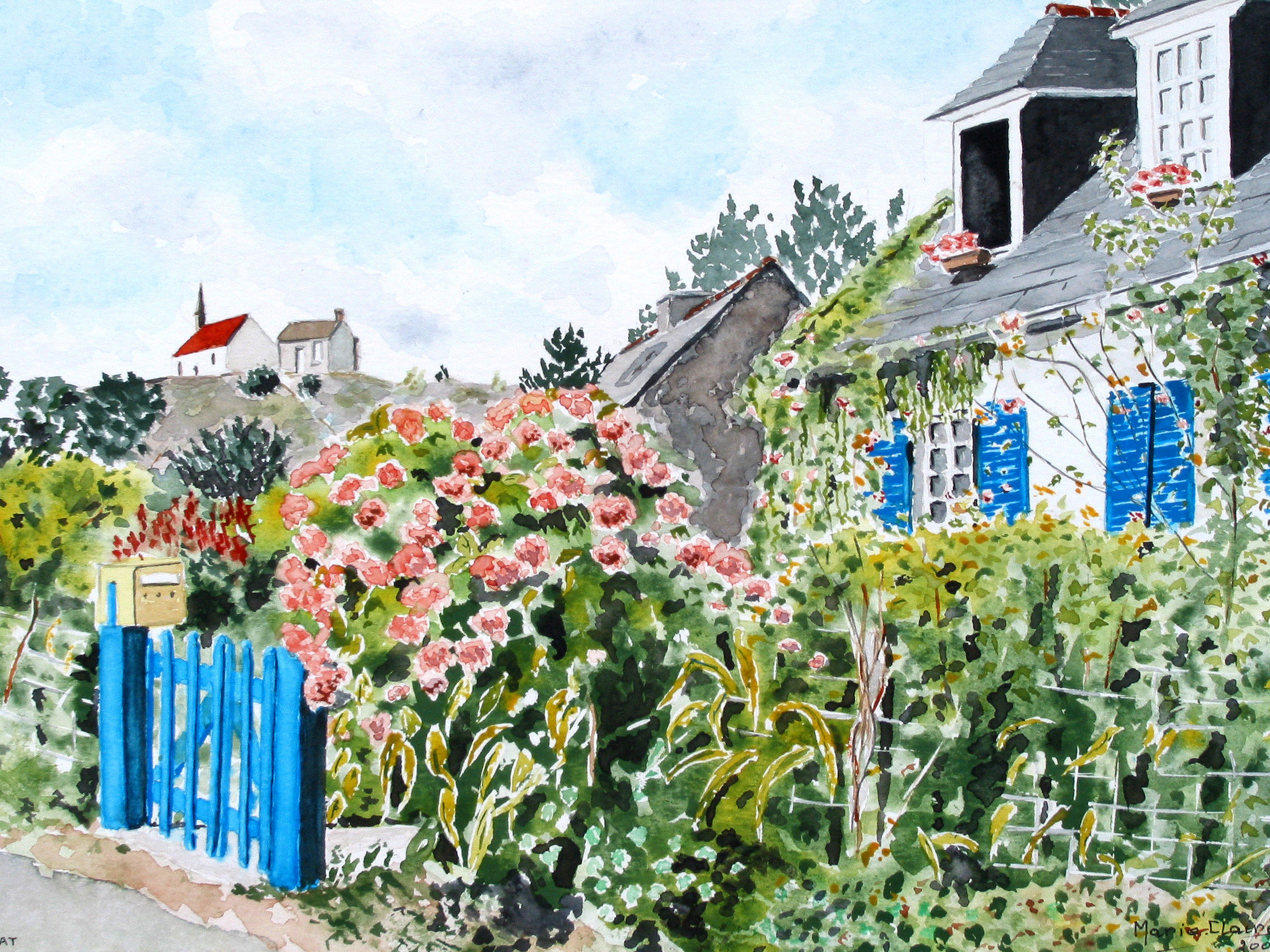
St Michael's chapel

== People linked to Île-de-Bréhat ==
- Pierre-Marie Le Bozec- Naval officer who lived and died here
- André César Vermare (1869–1949), renowned sculptor who resided and died in the island
- Marc Chagall (1887–1985), painted La fenêtre sur l'Ile de Bréhat, 1924, kept at Vereinigung Zürcher Kunstfreunde.
- Goudji (born 1941), the Georgian-born French sculptor and goldsmith, frequently resides in Bréhat; in 2008 he offered an item and participated in an auction to restore local religious monuments
- Marie-José Chombart de Lauwe, resistance fighter.

== See also ==
- Communes of the Côtes-d'Armor department
- Paimpol–Bréhat tidal farm
