= TELEMAC =

Open source software for computational fluid dynamics

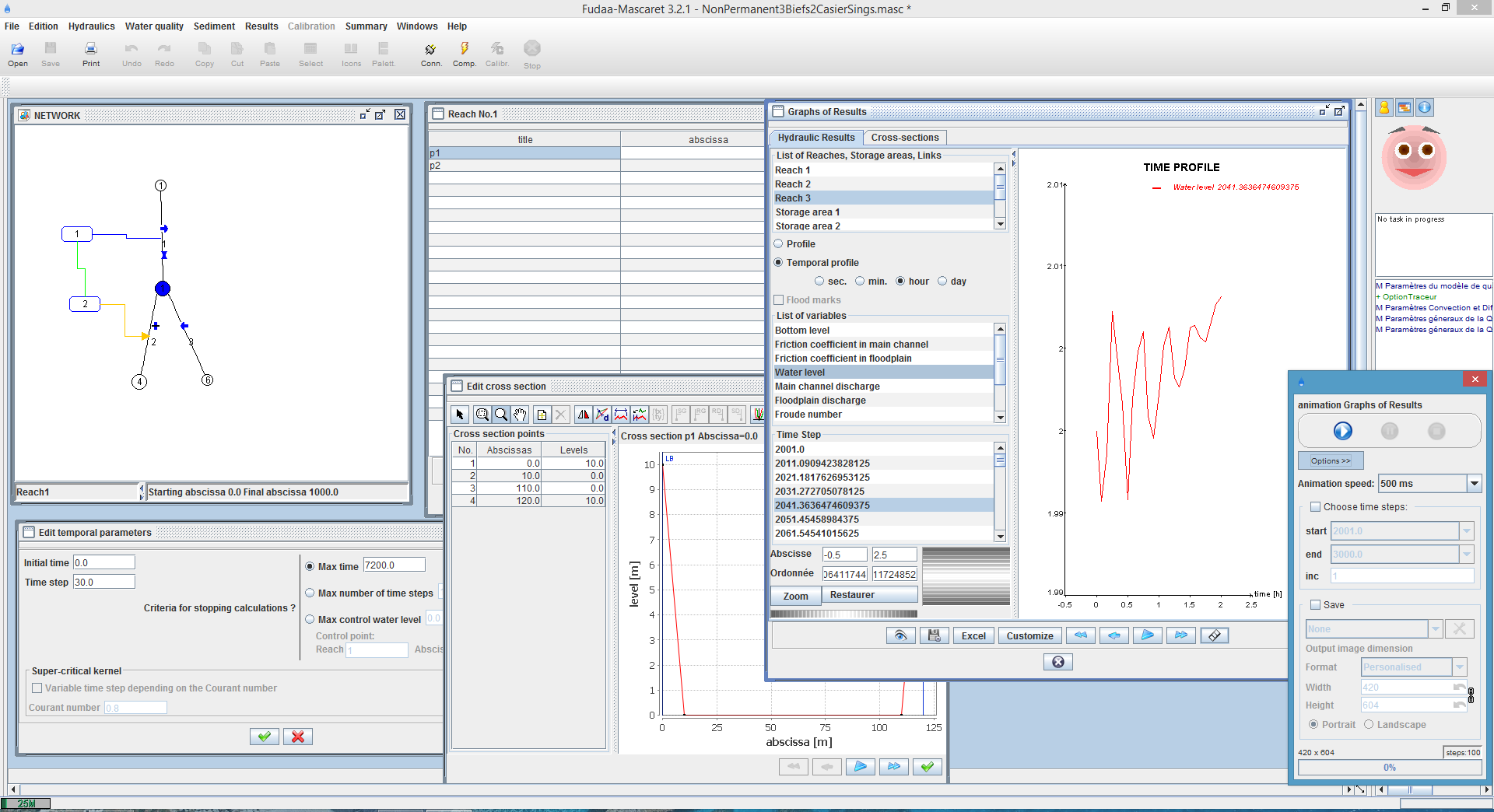
Screenshot of the FUDAA-MASCARET software

In computational fluid dynamics, TELEMAC is short for the open TELEMAC-MASCARET system, or a suite of finite element computer program owned by the Laboratoire National d'Hydraulique et Environnement (LNHE), part of the R&D group of Électricité de France. After many years of commercial distribution, a Consortium (the TELEMAC-MASCARET Consortium) was officially created in January 2010 to organize the open source distribution of the open TELEMAC-MASCARET system now available under GPLv3.

== Available modules ==
=== TELEMAC-2D ===
It 2D hydrodynamics module, TELEMAC-2D, solves the so-called shallow water equations, also known as the Saint Venant equations. TELEMAC-2D solves the Saint-Venant equations using the finite-element or finite-volume method and a computation mesh of triangular elements. It can perform simulations in transient and permanent conditions. TELEMAC-2D can take into account the following phenomena:

- Propagation of long waves, taking into account non-linear effects
- Bed friction
- Influence of Coriolis force
- Influence of meteorological factors: atmospheric pressure and wind
- Turbulence
- Torrent and river flows
- Influence of horizontal temperature or salinity gradients on density
- Cartesian or spherical coordinates for large domains
- Dry areas in the computational domain: intertidal flats and flood plains
- Current entrainment and diffusion of a tracer, with source and sink terms
- Monitoring of floats and Lagrangian drifts
- Treatment of singular points: sills, dikes, pipes.

TELEMAC-2D is used in many fields of application. In the maritime field, particular mention may be made of harbour structure design, studies of the effect of building submersible breakwaters or dredging works, the impact of discharges from a sea outfall, study of thermal plumes; and, with regard to rivers, the impact of various types of construction (bridges, sills, groynes), dam breaks, flood studies, transport of dissipating or non-dissipating tracers. TELEMAC-2D can also be used for a number of special applications, such as industrial reservoir failures, avalanches falling into reservoirs, etc.

=== TELEMAC-3D ===
It 3D hydrodynamics module, TELEMAC-3D, uses the same horizontally unstructured mesh as TELEMAC-2D but solves the Navier-Stokes equations, whether in hydrostatic or non-hydrostatic mode so allowing shorter waves than those in a shallow water context (where wavelengths are required to be at least twenty times the water depth). The wave formulation for the updating of the free surface is used for efficiency. The 3D mesh is developed as a series of meshed surfaces between the bed and the free surface. Flexibility in the placement of these planes permits the use of a sigma grid (each plane at a given proportion of the spacing between bed and surface) or a number of other strategies for intermediate surface location. One useful example is to include some planes which are at a fixed distance below the water surface, or above the bed. In the presence of a near-surface thermocline or halocline this is advantageous in so far as mixing water between the near-surface planes, where the greatest density gradients are located, can be avoided. When drying occurs the water depth falls to zero exactly and the planes collapse to a zero inter-layer spacing.

=== MASCARET ===
MASCARET includes 1-Dimensional free surface flow modelling engines. Based on the Saint-Venant equations, different modules can model various phenomenon over large areas and for varied geometries: meshed or branched network, subcritical or supercritical flows, steady or unsteady flows. MASCARET can represent:

- Flood propagation and modelling of floodplains
- Submersion wave resulting from dam break
- Regulation of managed rivers
- Flow in torrents,
- Canals wetting
- Sediment Transport
- Water quality (temperature, passive tracers ...)

=== ARTEMIS ===
ARTEMIS is a scientific software dedicated to the simulation of wave propagation towards the coast or into harbours, over a geographical domain of about few square km. The domain may be larger for simulation of long waves or resonance. The frequency dependence and directional spreading of the wave energy is taken into account by ARTEMIS. The computation retrieves the main wave characteristics over the computational domain: significant wave height, wave incidence, orbital velocities, breaking rate, ...

ARTEMIS solves the Berkhoff's equation or Mild Slope Equation through finite element formulation. The Mild Slope Equation has been extended to integrate dissipation processes. With a consistent set of boundary conditions, ARTEMIS is able to model the following processes:

- Bottom refraction
- Diffraction by obstacles
- Depth induced wave breaking
- Bottom friction
- Full or partial reflections against walls, breakwaters, dikes, ...
- Radiation or free outflow conditions

ARTEMIS has been validated on a set of reference tests and has been successfully used for numerous studies. The software has shown its ability to provide reliable wave agitation results in coastal areas, in the vicinity of maritime works and structures, or in the surf zone. ARTEMIS is an operational tool to determine project conditions:

- structure design,
- coastal management,
- wave conditions for wave driven currents and associated
- sand transport, ...
- breaking rate in the surroundings of a harbour for two different wave directions ...
- easily carrying into effect with the help of adapted pre and post-processors for mesh generation and results visualization.

=== TOMAWAC ===
TOMAWAC is used to model wave propagation in coastal areas. By means of a finite-element type method, it solves a simplified equation for the spectro-angular density of wave action. This is done for steady-state conditions (i.e. with a fixed depth of water throughout the simulation).

TOMAWAC is particularly simple to use. It can take into account any of the following physical phenomena:

- Wind-generated waves
- Refraction on the bottom
- Refraction by currents
- Dissipation through bathymetric wave breaking
- Dissipation through counter-current wave breaking

At each point of the computational mesh, TOMAWAC calculates the following information:

- Significant wave height
- Mean wave frequency
- Mean wave direction
- Peak wave frequency
- Wave-induced currents
- Radiation stresses

Validated with a variety of test cases and already used in numerous studies, TOMAWACis ideal for engineering projects: design of maritime structures, sediment transport by waves, current studies, etc.

Like all the other modules of the open TELEMAC-MASCARET system, TOMAWAC has the benefit of the system's powerful mesh generation and results display functions. It is also easy to link TOMAWAC and the hydrodynamic or solid transport modules, and to use the same computation grid for various modules (TELEMAC-2D, SISYPHE, TELEMAC-3D, etc.).

Like all the modules of the open TELEMAC-MASCARET system, TOMAWAC was developed in accordance with the quality assurance procedures followed in Electricité de France's Studies and Research Division. The software is supplied with a complete set of documents: theoretical description, user's manual and first steps, validation file, etc.

=== SISYPHE ===
SISYPHE is the state of the art sediment transport and bed evolution module of the TELEMAC-MASCARET modelling system. SISYPHE can be used to model complex morphodynamics processes in diverse environments, such as coastal, rivers, lakes and estuaries, for different flow rates, sediment size classes and sediment transport modes.

In SISYPHE, sediment transport processes are grouped as bed-load, suspended-load or total-load, with an extensive library of bed-load transport relations. SISYPHE is applicable to non-cohesive sediments that can be uniform (single-sized) or non-uniform (multiple-sized), cohesive sediments (multi-layer consolidation models), as well as sand-mud mixtures. A number of physically-based processes are incorporated into SISYPHE, such as the influence of secondary currents to precisely capture the complex flow field induced by channel curvature, the effect of bed slope associated with the influence of gravity, bed roughness predictors, and areas of unerodable bed, among others.

For currents only, SISYPHE can be tightly coupled to the depth-averaged shallow water module TELEMAC-2D or to the three-dimensional Reynolds-averaged Navier-Stokes module TELEMAC-3D. In order to account for the effect of waves or combined waves and currents, SISYPHE can be internally coupled to the waves module TOMAWAC.

SISYPHE can be easily expanded and customized to particular requirements by modifying friendly, easy to read Fortran files. To help the community of users and developers, SISYPHE includes a large number of examples, verification and validation tests for a range of applications.

=== Common techniques ===
Common to all its modules, finite volume style numerical techniques are used to ensure that both water and tracer can be well conserved in the presence of drying and subsequent wetting.

== See also ==
- List of computational fluid dynamics software
