= List of software for nuclear engineering =

With the decreased cost and increased capabilities of computers, Nuclear Engineering has implemented computer software (Computer code to Mathematical model) into all facets of this field. There are a wide variety of fields associated with nuclear engineering, but computers and associated software are used most often in design and analysis. Neutron kinetics, thermal-hydraulics, and structural mechanics are all important in this effort. Each software needs to be tested and verified before use. The codes can be separated by use and function. Most of the software are written in C and Fortran.

== Monte Carlo Radiation Transport ==
- COG (LLNL)
- Geant4 (CERN)
- McCARD (KAIST)
- MCNP (LANL)
- MCU (MCU) (Kurchatov Institute)
- OpenMC
- PHITS (JAEA)
- SCALE (KENO V and KENO VI) (ORNL)
- Serpent (VTT)
- TRIPOLI-4 (CEA)

== Transmutation, fuel depletion ==
- ACAB code Activation and transmutation calculations for nuclear applications
- ORIP_XXI code Isotope transmutation simulations
- ORILL Code 1D transmutation, fuel depletion (burn-up) and radiological protection code
- FISPACT-II Multiphysics, inventory and source-term code
- MURE Serpent-MCNP utility for Reactor Evolution
- VESTA Monte Carlo depletion interface code

=== Reactor Systems Analysis ===
psr-0315	AMPX-77, Modular System for Coupled Neutron-Gamma MultiGroup Cross-Sections from ENDF/B-5
ccc-0459	BOLD/VENTURE-4, Reactor Analysis System with Sensitivity and Burnup
nesc0387	CITATION, 3-D MultiGroup Diffusion with 1st Order Perturbation and Criticality Search
ccc-0643	CITATION-LDI2, 2-D MultiGroup Diffusion, Perturbation, Criticality Search, for PC
ccc-0650	DOORS3.2A, 1-,2-,3-dimensional discrete-ordinates system for deep-penetration neutron and photon transport
uscd1234	DRAGON 3.05D, Reactor Cell Calculation System with Burnup
nesc0784	DSNP, Program and Data Library System for Dynamic Simulation of Nuclear Power Plant
nea-1683	ERANOS 2.3N, Modular code and data system for fast reactor neutronics analyses
nea-1916	FINPSA TRAINING 2.2.0.1 -R-, a PSA model in consisting of event trees, fault trees, and cut sets
nea-0624	JOSHUA, Neutronics, Hydraulics, Burnup, Refuelling of LWR
psr-0608	SAPHIRE 8.0.9, Systems Analysis Programs for Hands-On Integrated Reliability Evaluations
iaea1439	STACY, Very High Temp. Reactor V/HTR Safety Analyses for the Quantification of Fission Product Release from the Fuel
iaea1437	SUPERMC 3.3.0, Super Monte Carlo simulation program for nuclear and radiation process
iaea1370	TRIGLAV, Research Reactor Calculations
uscd1239	VENTEASY, Criticality Search for a Desired Keffective by Adjusting Dimensions, Nuclide Concentrations, or Buckling
ccc-0654	VENTURE-PC 1.1, Reactor Analysis System with Sensitivity and Burnup
iaea0871	VPI-NECM, Nuclear Engineering Program Collection for College Training
nea-0655	VSOP, Neutron Spectra, 2-D Flux Synthesis, Fuel Management, Thermohydraulics Calculation
iaea1440	VSOP99-11, Neutron Spectra, 2-D Flux Synthesis, Fuel Management, Thermohydraulics Calculation

=== Particle Accelerators and High Voltage Machines ===
nesc0983	EGUN, Charged Particle Trajectories in Electromagnetic Focusing System
ests0428	POISSON SUPERFISH, Poisson Equation Solver for Radio Frequency Cavity
ccc-0228	SPAR, High-Energy Muon, Pion, Heavy Ion Stopping-Powers and Ranges

=== Magnetic Fusion Research ===
nea-1839	ACAB-2008, ACtivation ABacus Code
nea-1638	ANITA-IEAF, Isotope Inventories from Intermediate Energy Neutron Irradiation for Fusion Applications
nesc0873	COAST-4, Design and Cost of Tokamak Fusion Reactors
nea-1200	ELEORBIT, 3-D Simulation of Electron Orbits in Magnetic Multipole Plasma Source
nea-0490	HEDO-2, Magnetic Field Calculation and Plot of Air Core Coils
nea-0583	MEDUSA-PIJ, 1-D Thermohydraulic Analysis of Laser Driven Plasma
ccc-0858	TMAP7, Tritium Migration Analysis Program

== Toolkit ==
- PyNE The Nuclear Engineering Toolkit

== Nuclear Fuel Cycle ==
- Cyclus An agent-based framework for modeling the flow of material through nuclear fuel cycles.

== Deterministic Radiation Transport ==
- CASMO5 (Studsvik)
- HELIOS-2 (Studsvik)
- SCALE (Oak Ridge National Laboratory)
- MPACT (Oak Ridge National Laboratory)
- THOR
- nTRACER (Seoul National University)

== Steady-state Reactor Analysis ==
- SIMULATE5

== Spatial Kinetics ==
- PARCS
- SIMULATE-3K
- NESTLE

== Thermal-Hydraulics ==
- ATHLET (GRS, Gesellschaft für Anlagen- und Reaktorsicherheit)
- TRACE (NRC)
- SPACE (KEPCO)
- RELAP5-3D (Idaho National Laboratory)
- GOTHIC (Numerical Advisory Solutions)
- CATHARE (CEA)
- FLICA-4 (CEA)
- RETRAN (RETRAN-02 and RETRAN-3D)
- VIPRE-01
- PROTO-FLO
- PROTO-HX
- PROTO-HVAC
- PROTO-Sprinkler

== Computational Fluid Dynamics ==
- CFX (ANSYS)
- FLUENT (ANSYS)
- StarCD (Siemens)
- STAR-CCM+ (Siemens)
- LOGOS
- COBRA-TF
- GOTHIC
- TransAT
- code_saturne (EDF)
- neptune_cfd (EDF)
- Trio_CFD (CEA)

== Severe Accident ==
- ATHLET-CD (GRS)
- MELCOR (Sandia National Laboratories)
- MAAP (EPRI)
- ASTEC (IRSN and GRS)

Many codes are supported by the U.S. Nuclear Regulatory Commission (NRC). These include SCALE, PARCS, TRACE (Formerly RELAP5 and TRAC-B), MELCOR, and many others.

http://www.nrc.gov/about-nrc/regulatory/research/safetycodes.html

== See also ==
- Safety code (nuclear reactor)
- Computational science
- Computational physics
- Computer simulation
- List of computational physics software
- List of plasma physics software
- List of software for nanostructures modeling
