= Discrete ordinates method =

In the theory of radiative transfer, of either thermal or neutron radiation, a position and direction-dependent intensity function is usually sought for the description of the radiation field. The intensity field can in principle be solved from the integrodifferential radiative transfer equation (RTE), but an exact solution is usually impossible and even in the case of geometrically simple systems can contain unusual special functions such as the Chandrasekhar's H-function and Chandrasekhar's X- and Y-functions. The method of discrete ordinates, or the S_{n} method, is one way to approximately solve the RTE by discretizing both the xyz-domain and the angular variables that specify the direction of radiation. The methods were developed by Subrahmanyan Chandrasekhar when he was working on radiative transfer.

== Radiative transfer equation ==
In the case of time-independent monochromatic radiation in an elastically scattering medium, the RTE is

$\mathbf{s}\cdot \nabla I(\mathbf{r},\mathbf{s}) = \kappa I_b (\mathbf{r}) - \beta I(\mathbf{r},\mathbf{s}) + \frac{\sigma}{4\pi}\int_{4\pi}I(\mathbf{r},\mathbf{s})\Phi (\mathbf{s},\mathbf{s'})d\Omega '$

where the first term on the RHS is the contribution of emission, the second term the contribution of absorption and the last term is the contribution from scattering in the medium. The variable $\mathbf{s}$ is a unit vector that specifies the direction of radiation and the variable $\mathbf{s'}$ is a dummy integration variable for the calculation of scattering from direction $\mathbf{s'}$ to direction $\mathbf{s}$.

== Angular discretization ==
In the discrete ordinates method, the full solid angle of $4\pi$ is divided to some number of discrete angular intervals, and the continuous direction variable $\mathbf{s}$ is replaced by a discrete set of direction vectors $\mathbf{s_j}$. Then the scattering integral in the RTE, which makes the solution problematic, becomes a sum

$\sum_{j=1}^n w_j I(\mathbf{r},\mathbf{s_j})\Phi (\mathbf{s_j},\mathbf{s_i})$

where the numbers $w_j$ are weighting coefficients for the different direction vectors. With this the RTE becomes a linear system of equations for a multi-index object, the number of indices depending on the dimensionality and symmetry properties of the problem.

== Solution ==
It is possible to solve the resulting linear system directly with Gauss–Jordan elimination, but this is problematic due to the large memory requirement for storing the matrix of the linear system. Another way is to use iterative methods, where the required number of iterations for a given degree of accuracy depends on the strength of scattering.

== Neutron transport ==
The ten directions of an S8 level-symmetric set in one octant of the unit sphere

The transport equation is evaluated at each discrete direction, using the quadrature weights to approximate the scattering integral by a weighted sum over the ordinate set, which results in one equation per direction, coupled through the scattering source.

The six ordinates of an S6 angular discretization in slab geometry and the Gauss-Legendre weights of the positive ordinates.

In slab geometry the Gauss–Legendre and double-Legendre quadrature sets are most often used, with ordinates and weights symmetric about zero, while in multidimensional geometry level symmetric sets arranged on the unit octant are widely used.

The scalar flux follows from the angular flux at the ordinates,

$\phi(x) = \frac{1}{2}\sum_{n=1}^{N} w_n \psi_n(x),$

where $\psi_n(x)$ is the angular flux for the ordinate with direction cosine $\mu_n$, $\phi(x)$ the scalar flux, and the weights are normalized so that they sum to two.

The system resulting from differencing the spatial variables is solved by iteration on the scattering source, sweeping through the space angle grid along the directions of neutron travel. When the sources are localized and the scattering is small, ray effects can show up when low order quadrature is used, but they are artifacts that arise from the quadrature's inability to approximate the scalar flux from the angular flux.

== Applications ==
The discrete ordinates method, or some variation of it, is applied for solving radiation intensities in several physics and engineering simulation programs, such as COMSOL Multiphysics or the Fire Dynamics Simulator.

== See also ==
- Radiative transfer
- Thermal radiation
- Neutron radiation
- Bickley-Naylor functions
