= Secondary measure =

Concept in mathematics

In mathematics, the secondary measure associated with a measure of positive density ρ when there is one, is a measure of positive density μ, turning the secondary polynomials associated with the orthogonal polynomials for ρ into an orthogonal system.

== Introduction ==
Under certain assumptions, it is possible to obtain the existence of a secondary measure and even to express it.

For example, this can be done when working in the Hilbert space L^{2}([0, 1], R, ρ)

$$\forall x \in [0,1], \qquad \mu(x)=\frac{\rho(x)}{\frac{\varphi^2(x)}{4} + \pi^2\rho^2(x)}$$

with

$$\varphi(x) = \lim_{\varepsilon \to 0^+} 2\int_0^1\frac{(x-t)\rho(t)}{(x-t)^2+\varepsilon^2} \, dt$$

in the general case, or:

$$\varphi(x) = 2\rho(x)\text{ln}\left(\frac{x}{1-x}\right) - 2 \int_0^1\frac{\rho(t)-\rho(x)}{t-x} \, dt$$

when ρ satisfies a Lipschitz condition.

This application φ is called the reducer of ρ.

More generally, μ et ρ are linked by their Stieltjes transformation with the following formula:

$$S_{\mu}(z)=z-c_1-\frac{1}{S_{\rho}(z)}$$

in which c_{1} is the moment of order 1 of the measure ρ.

Secondary measures and the theory around them may be used to derive traditional formulas of analysis concerning the Gamma function, the Riemann zeta function, and the Euler–Mascheroni constant.

They have also allowed the clarification of various integrals and series, although this tends to be difficult a priori.

Finally they make it possible to solve integral equations of the form

$$f(x)=\int_0^1\frac{g(t)-g(x)}{t-x}\rho(t)\,dt$$

where g is the unknown function, and lead to theorems of convergence towards the Chebyshev and Dirac measures.

== The broad outlines of the theory ==
Let ρ be a measure of positive density on an interval I and admitting moments of any order. From this, a family {P_{n}} of orthogonal polynomials for the inner product induced by ρ can be created.

Let {Q_{n}} be the sequence of the secondary polynomials associated with the family P. Under certain conditions there is a measure for which the family Q is orthogonal. This measure, which can be clarified from ρ, is called a secondary measure associated initial measure ρ.

When ρ is a probability density function, a sufficient condition that allows μ to be a secondary measure associated with ρ while admitting moments of any order is that its Stieltjes Transformation is given by an equality of the type

$$S_{\mu}(z)=a\left(z-c_1-\frac{1}{S_{\rho}(z)}\right),$$

where a is an arbitrary constant and c_{1} indicates the moment of order 1 of ρ.

For a = 1, the measure known as secondary can be obtained. For n ≥ 1 the norm of the polynomial P_{n} for ρ coincides exactly with the norm of the secondary polynomial associated Q_{n} when using the measure μ.

In this paramount case, and if the space generated by the orthogonal polynomials is dense in L^{2}(I, R, ρ), the operator T_{ρ} defined by

$$f(x) \mapsto \int_I \frac{f(t)-f(x)}{t-x}\rho (t)dt$$

creating the secondary polynomials can be furthered to a linear map connecting space L^{2}(I, R, ρ) to L^{2}(I, R, μ) and becomes isometric if limited to the hyperplane H_{ρ} of the orthogonal functions with P_{0} = 1.

For unspecified functions square integrable for ρ a more general formula of covariance may be obtained:

$$\langle f/g \rangle_\rho - \langle f/1 \rangle_\rho\times \langle g/1\rangle_\rho = \langle T_\rho(f)/T_\rho (g) \rangle_\mu.$$

The theory continues by introducing the concept of reducible measure, meaning that the quotient ρ/μ is element of L^{2}(I, R, μ). The following results are then established:

- The reducer φ of ρ is an antecedent of ρ/μ for the operator T_{ρ}. (In fact the only antecedent which belongs to H_{ρ}).
- For any function square integrable for ρ, there is an equality known as the reducing formula:

$$\langle f/\varphi \rangle_\rho = \langle T_\rho (f)/1 \rangle_\rho$$.

- The operator

$$f\mapsto \varphi\times f -T_\rho (f)$$
defined on the polynomials is prolonged in an isometry S_{ρ} linking the closure of the space of these polynomials in L^{2}(I, R, ρ^{2}μ^{−1}) to the hyperplane H_{ρ} provided with the norm induced by ρ.

- Under certain restrictive conditions the operator S_{ρ} acts like the adjoint of T_{ρ} for the inner product induced by ρ.

Finally the two operators are also connected, provided the images in question are defined, by the fundamental formula of composition:

$$T_\rho\circ S_\rho \left( f\right)=\frac{\rho}{\mu}\times (f).$$

== Case of the Lebesgue measure and some other examples ==
The Lebesgue measure on the standard interval [0, 1] is obtained by taking the constant density ρ(x) = 1.

The associated orthogonal polynomials are called (shifted) Legendre polynomials and can be defined as
$$P_n(x)=\frac{d^n}{dx^n}\left(x^n(1-x)^n\right).$$
The norm of these P_{n} is then
$$\frac{n!}{\sqrt{2n+1}}$$
and the recurrence relation in three terms can be written
$$2(2n+1)xP_n(x)=-P_{n+1}(x)+(2n+1)P_n(x)-n^2P_{n-1}(x).$$

The reducer of this measure of Lebesgue is given by

$$\varphi(x)=2\ln\left(\frac{x}{1-x}\right).$$

The associated secondary measure is then clarified as

$$\mu(x)=\frac{1}{\ln^2\left(\frac{x}{1-x}\right)+\pi^2}$$.

If we normalize the polynomials of Legendre, the coefficients of Fourier of the reducer φ related to this orthonormal system are null for an even index and are given by

$$C_n(\varphi)=-\frac{4\sqrt{2n+1}}{n(n+1)}$$

for an odd index n.

The Laguerre polynomials are linked to the density ρ(x) = e^{−x} on the interval I = [0, ∞). They are clarified by

$$L_n(x)=\frac{e^x}{n!}\frac{d^n}{dx^n}(x^ne^{-x})=\sum_{k=0}^{n}\binom{n}{k}(-1)^k\frac{x^k}{k!}$$

and are normalized.

The reducer associated is defined by

$$\varphi(x)=2\left (\ln(x)-\int_0^{\infty}e^{-t}\ln|x-t|dt\right ).$$

The coefficients of Fourier of the reducer φ related to the Laguerre polynomials are given by

$$C_n(\varphi)=-\frac{1}{n}\sum_{k=0}^{n-1}\frac{1}{\binom{n-1}{k}}.$$

This coefficient C_{n}(φ) is no other than the opposite of the sum of the elements of the line of index n in the table of the harmonic triangular numbers of Leibniz.

The Hermite polynomials are linked to the Gaussian density

$$\rho(x)=\frac{e^{-\frac{x^2}{2}}}{\sqrt{2\pi}}$$

on I = R.

They are clarified by

$$H_n(x)=\frac{1}{\sqrt{n!}}e^{\frac{x^2}{2}}\frac{d^n}{dx^n}\left(e^{-\frac{x^2}{2}}\right)$$

and are normalized.

The reducer associated is defined by

$$\varphi(x)=-\frac{2}{\sqrt{2\pi}}\int_{-\infty}^{\infty}te^{-\frac{t^2}{2}}\ln|x-t|\,dt.$$

The coefficients of Fourier of the reducer φ related to the system of Hermite polynomials are null for an even index and are given by

$$C_n(\varphi)=(-1)^{\frac{n+1}{2}}\frac{\left(\frac{n-1}{2}\right)!}{\sqrt{n!}}$$

for an odd index n.

The Chebyshev measure of the second form. This is defined by the density

$$\rho(x)=\frac{8}{\pi}\sqrt{x(1-x)}$$

on the interval [0, 1].

It is the only one which coincides with its secondary measure normalised on this standard interval. Under certain conditions it occurs as the limit of the sequence of normalized secondary measures of a given density.

=== Examples of non-reducible measures ===
Jacobi measure on (0, 1) of density

$$\rho(x)=\frac{2}{\pi}\sqrt{\frac{1-x}{x}}.$$

Chebyshev measure on (−1, 1) of the first form of density

$$\rho(x)=\frac{1}{\pi\sqrt{1-x^2}}.$$

== Sequence of secondary measures ==
The secondary measure μ associated with a probability density function ρ has its moment of order 0 given by the formula

$$d_0 = c_2 -c_1^2,$$

where c_{1} and c_{2} indicating the respective moments of order 1 and 2 of ρ.

This process can be iterated by 'normalizing' μ while defining ρ_{1} = μ/d_{0} which becomes in its turn a density of probability called naturally the normalised secondary measure associated with ρ.

From ρ_{1}, a secondary normalised measure ρ_{2} can be created. This can be iterated to obtain ρ_{3} from ρ_{2} and so on.

Therefore, a sequence of successive secondary measures, created from ρ_{0} = ρ, is such that ρ_{n+1} that is the secondary normalised measure deduced from ρ_{n}

It is possible to clarify the density ρ_{n} by using the orthogonal polynomials P_{n} for ρ, the secondary polynomials Q_{n} and the reducer associated φ. This gives the formula

$$\rho_n(x)=\frac{1}{d_0^{n-1}} \frac{\rho(x)}{\left(P_{n-1}(x) \frac{\varphi(x)}{2}-Q_{n-1}(x)\right)^2 + \pi^2\rho^2(x) P_{n-1}^2(x)}.$$

The coefficient $d_0^{n-1}$ is easily obtained starting from the leading coefficients of the polynomials P_{n−1} and P_{n}. The reducer φ_{n} associated with ρ_{n}, as well as the orthogonal polynomials corresponding to ρ_{n}, can also be clarified.

The evolution of these densities when the index tends towards the infinite can be related to the support of the measure on the standard interval [0, 1]:

Let

$$xP_n (x)=t_nP_{n+1}(x)+s_nP_n(x)+t_{n-1}P_{n-1}(x)$$

be the classic recurrence relation in three terms. If

$$\lim_{n \mapsto \infty} t_n=\tfrac{1}{4}, \quad \lim_{n \mapsto \infty} s_n =\tfrac{1}{2},$$

then the sequence {ρ_{n}} converges completely towards the Chebyshev density of the second form

$$\rho_{tch}(x)=\frac{8}{\pi}\sqrt{x(1-x)}$$.

These conditions about limits are checked by a very broad class of traditional densities. A derivation of the sequence of secondary measures and convergence can be found in.

=== Equinormal measures ===
One calls two measures thus leading to the same normalised secondary density. It is remarkable that the elements of a given class and having the same moment of order 1 are connected by a homotopy. More precisely, if the density function ρ has its moment of order 1 equal to c_{1}, then these densities equinormal with ρ are given by a formula of the type:

$$\rho_{t}(x)=\frac{t\rho(x)}{\left (\tfrac{1}{2}(t-1)(x-c_1)\varphi(x)-t\right )^2+\pi^2\rho^2(x)(t-1)^2(x-c_1)^2},$$

t describing an interval containing ]0, 1].

If μ is the secondary measure of ρ, that of ρ_{t} will be tμ.

The reducer of ρ_{t} is

$$\varphi_t(x)=\frac{2 (x-c_1)-tG(x)}{\left((x-c_1)-t\tfrac{1}{2}G(x) \right)^2+t^2\pi^2\mu^2(x)}$$

by noting G(x) the reducer of μ.

Orthogonal polynomials for the measure ρ_{t} are clarified from n = 1 by the formula

$$P_n^t(x)=\frac{tP_n(x)+(1-t)(x-c_1)Q_n(x)}{\sqrt{t}}$$

with Q_{n} secondary polynomial associated with P_{n}.

It is remarkable also that, within the meaning of distributions, the limit when t tends towards 0 per higher value of ρ_{t} is the Dirac measure concentrated at c_{1}.

For example, the equinormal densities with the Chebyshev measure of the second form are defined by:

$$\rho_t(x)=\frac{2t\sqrt{1-x^2}}{\pi\left[t^2+4(1-t)x^2\right]},$$

with t describing ]0, 2]. The value t = 2 gives the Chebyshev measure of the first form.

== Applications ==
In the formulas below G is Catalan's constant, γ is the Euler's constant, β_{2n} is the Bernoulli number of order 2n, H_{2n+1} is the harmonic number of order 2n+1 and Ei is the Exponential integral function.

$$\frac{1}{\ln(p)} = \frac{1}{p-1}+\int_0^{\infty}\frac{1}{(x+p)(\ln^2(x)+\pi^2)} dx \qquad \qquad \forall p > 1$$
$$\gamma = \int_0^{\infty}\frac{\ln(1+\frac{1}{x})}{\ln^2(x)+\pi^2} dx$$
$$\gamma = \frac{1}{2}+\int_0^{\infty} \frac{\overline {(x+1)\cos(\pi x)}}{x+1} dx$$

The notation $x\mapsto \overline {(x+1)\cos(\pi x)}$ indicating the 2 periodic function coinciding with $x\mapsto (x+1) \cos(\pi x)$ on (−1, 1).

$$\gamma = \frac{1}{2} + \sum_{k=1}^{n} \frac{\beta_{2k}}{2k} - \frac{\beta_{2n}}{\zeta(2n)}\int_1^{\infty} \lfloor t \rfloor \cos(2\pi t) t^{-2n-1} dt$$
$$\beta_k = \frac{(-1)^kk!}{\pi} \text{Im} \left(\int_{-\infty}^{\infty} \frac{e^x}{(1+e^x)(x-i\pi)^k} dx \right)$$
$$\int_0^1\ln^{2n}\left(\frac{x}{1-x}\right)\,dx = (-1)^{n+1}(2^{2n}-2)\beta_{2n}\pi^{2n}$$
$$\int_0^1\cdots \int_0^1 \left(\sum_{k=1}^{2n} \frac{\ln(t_k)}{\prod_{i \neq k}(t_k-t_i)}\right)\, dt_1 \cdots dt_{2n}=\tfrac{1}{2}(-1)^{n+1}(2\pi)^{2n}\beta_{2n}$$
$$\int_0^{\infty}\frac{e^{-\alpha x}}{\Gamma(x+1)}dx = e^{e^{-\alpha}}-1+\int_0^{\infty} \frac{1-e^{-x}}{(\ln(x)+\alpha)^2+\pi^2}\frac{dx}{x} \qquad \qquad \forall \alpha \in \mathbf{R}$$
$$\sum_{n=1}^{\infty} \left(\frac{1}{n}\sum_{k=0}^{n-1} \frac{1}{\binom{n-1}{k}}\right)^2=\tfrac{4}{9}\pi^2=\int_0^{\infty}4 \left (\mathrm {Ei} (1,-x)+i\pi \right )^2 e^{-3x} \, dx.$$
$$\frac{23}{15}-\ln(2) = \sum_{n=0}^{\infty} \frac{1575}{2(n+1)(2n+1)(4n-3)(4n-1)(4n+1)(4n+5)(4n+7)(4n+9)}$$
$$G= \sum_{k=0}^{\infty} \frac{(-1)^k}{4^{k+1}} \left(\frac{1}{(4k+3)^2}+\frac{2}{(4k+2)^2}+\frac{2}{(4k+1)^2}\right)+\frac{\pi}{8}\ln(2)$$
$$G= \frac{\pi}{8}\ln(2)+\sum_{n=0}^{\infty}(-1)^n\frac{H_{2n+1}}{2n+1}.$$

If the measure ρ is reducible and let φ be the associated reducer, one has the equality

$$\int_I\varphi^2(x)\rho(x) \, dx = \frac{4\pi^2}{3}\int_I\rho^3(x) \, dx.$$

If the measure ρ is reducible with μ the associated reducer, then if f is square integrable for μ, and if g is square integrable for ρ and is orthogonal with P_{0} = 1, the following equivalence holds:

$$f(x)=\int_I\frac{g(t)-g(x)}{t-x}\rho(t)dt \Leftrightarrow g(x)=(x-c_1)f(x)-T_{\mu}(f(x))=\frac{\varphi(x)\mu(x)}{\rho(x)}f(x)-T_{\rho} \left(\frac{\mu(x)}{\rho(x)}f(x)\right)$$

c_{1} indicates the moment of order 1 of ρ and T_{ρ} the operator

$$g(x)\mapsto \int_I\frac{g(t)-g(x)}{t-x}\rho(t)\,dt.$$

In addition, the sequence of secondary measures has applications in Quantum Mechanics, where it gives rise to the sequence of residual spectral densities for specialized Pauli-Fierz Hamiltonians. This also provides a physical interpretation for the sequence of secondary measures.

== See also ==
- Orthogonal polynomials
- Probability
