= Goodwin–Staton integral =

Special function defined by a Gaussian integral

In mathematics, the Goodwin–Staton integral is the special function

$$G(z)=\int_0^\infty \frac{e^{-t^2}}{t+z}\,dt,\qquad |\arg z|<\pi.$$

The restriction on the argument excludes the non-positive real axis, where the denominator can vanish along the path of integration. The integral is named after E. T. Goodwin and J. Staton, who published a numerical table of the corresponding real integral in 1948.

== Relation to other special functions ==
For positive real $x$, the Goodwin–Staton integral is related to Dawson's integral $F$ and the exponential integral by

$$G(x)=\sqrt{\pi}\,F(x)-\frac12 e^{-x^2}\mathrm{Ei}(x^2),\qquad x>0.$$

== Differential equations ==
Differentiating the defining integral and integrating by parts gives the first-order inhomogeneous differential equation

$$G'(z)+2zG(z)=\sqrt{\pi}-\frac1z.$$

Differentiating this relation twice and eliminating the inhomogeneous term gives the third-order linear homogeneous equation

$$zG'''(z)+(2+2z^2)G''(z)+8zG'(z)+4G(z)=0.$$

== Properties on the positive real axis ==
For $x>0$, differentiation under the integral sign gives

$$G^{(n)}(x)=(-1)^n n!\int_0^\infty \frac{e^{-t^2}}{(t+x)^{n+1}}\,dt.$$

Hence

$$(-1)^nG^{(n)}(x)>0,\qquad n=0,1,2,\ldots,$$

so $G$ is a completely monotonic function on $(0,\infty)$. In particular, $G$ is positive, strictly decreasing, and convex there.

== Series near the origin ==
D. S. Jones studied the generalized Goodwin–Staton integral and obtained convergent series representations. Specializing Jones's equation (2.11) gives, for $|\arg z|<\pi$,

$$G(z)=e^{-z^2}\left(-\log z-\frac{\gamma}{2}-\frac12\sum_{m=1}^{\infty}\frac{z^{2m}}{m!\,m}+\frac{\sqrt{\pi}}{2}\sum_{m=0}^{\infty}\frac{z^{2m+1}}{m!\left(m+\frac12\right)}\right),$$

where $\log z$ is the principal logarithm and $\gamma$ is the Euler–Mascheroni constant.

Consequently, as $z\to0$ within the cut plane,

$$G(z)=-\log z-\frac{\gamma}{2}+\sqrt{\pi}\,z+\left(\log z+\frac{\gamma}{2}-\frac12\right)z^2-\frac{2\sqrt{\pi}}{3}z^3+\left(\frac38-\frac{\gamma}{4}-\frac12\log z\right)z^4+O(z^5).$$

In particular,

$$G(x)\sim-\log x-\frac{\gamma}{2}\qquad (x\to0^+).$$

== Asymptotic expansion ==
For large positive $x$, the integral has the asymptotic expansion

$$G(x)\sim\frac12\sum_{n=0}^{\infty}(-1)^n\Gamma\left(\frac{n+1}{2}\right)x^{-n-1}\qquad (x\to+\infty).$$

Thus its first terms are

$$G(x)\sim\frac{\sqrt{\pi}}{2x}-\frac{1}{2x^2}+\frac{\sqrt{\pi}}{4x^3}-\frac{1}{2x^4}+\frac{3\sqrt{\pi}}{8x^5}-\frac{1}{x^6}+\cdots.$$

The NIST Digital Library of Mathematical Functions refers to Olver for corresponding expansions with bounds on the remainder for both real and complex values of the argument.

== Generalized Goodwin–Staton integral ==
Jones considered the generalized integral

$$I(\mu,z)=\int_0^\infty \frac{t^\mu e^{-t^2}}{t-z}\,dt,$$

where $\mu$ is real with $\mu>-1$ and $z$ lies off the positive real axis. The ordinary Goodwin–Staton integral is the special case

$$G(z)=I(0,-z).$$

The generalized integral is a Stieltjes transform and satisfies the recurrence

$$I(\mu+1,z)=\frac12\Gamma\left(\frac{\mu+1}{2}\right)+zI(\mu,z),$$

as well as

$$\frac{\partial I(\mu,z)}{\partial z}=\mu I(\mu-1,z)-2I(\mu+1,z),\qquad \mu>0.$$

Jones derived convergent series, asymptotic expansions, and explicit error bounds, and also treated oscillatory and logarithmic variants. Mamedov later gave another evaluation of generalized Goodwin–Staton integrals using the binomial expansion theorem.

== Numerical evaluation ==
For positive real arguments, numerical evaluation can be reduced to Dawson's integral and the exponential integral through the relation above. For small and moderate arguments, Jones's convergent series can be used, while for large arguments the asymptotic expansion is more suitable. The DLMF section on computation of the Goodwin–Staton integral cites the original table of Goodwin and Staton.

== See also ==
- Dawson function
- Exponential integral
- Incomplete gamma function
- Stieltjes transformation
