= Neutron transport =

Study of motions and interactions of neutrons

Neutron transport (also known as neutronics) is a specialization of nuclear physics that studies motions and interactions of neutrons with materials. The neutron transport equation models the radiative transfer of neutrons and is commonly used to determine the behavior of nuclear reactor cores and experimental or industrial neutron beams.

== Background ==
Neutron transport has roots in the Boltzmann equation, which was used in the 1800s to study the kinetic theory of gases. It did not receive large-scale development until the invention of chain-reaction nuclear reactors in the 1940s. As neutron distribution came under detailed scrutiny, elegant approximations and analytic solutions were found in simple geometries. However, as computational power increased, numerical approaches to neutron transport have become prevalent. Using massively parallel computers, neutron transport remains under active development in academia and research institutions throughout the world. It is computationally challenging since it depends on time and the three dimensions of space, and the energy variable spans about nine orders of magnitude, from thermal energies of a few tens of meV to fission-neutron energies of several MeV (up to about 10 MeV). Modern solutions use discrete ordinates, Monte Carlo methods, or a hybrid of both.

== Neutron transport equation ==
The neutron transport equation is a balance statement that conserves neutrons. Each term represents a gain or a loss of a neutron, and the balance, in essence, claims that neutrons gained equals neutrons lost. It is formulated as follows:

$\left(\frac{1}{v(E)}\frac{\partial}{\partial t}+\mathbf{\hat{\Omega}}\cdot\nabla+\Sigma_t(\mathbf{r},E,t)\right) \psi(\mathbf{r},E,\mathbf{\hat{\Omega}},t)=\quad$$\quad\frac{\chi_p \left( \bold{r},E \right)}{4\pi}\left[ 1-\tilde{\beta}(\bold{r}) \right]\int_0^{\infty} \mathrm dE^{\prime}\nu_p \left( \bold{r},E^{\prime} \right) \Sigma_f \left(\mathbf{r}, E^{\prime}, t \right) \phi \left( \mathbf{r}, E^{\prime}, t \right)$
$$\quad + \sum_{i=1}^N \frac{\chi_{di}\left( \bold{r},E \right)}{4\pi} \lambda_i C_i \left( \mathbf{r}, t \right)\quad$$
$$\quad + \int_{4\pi}\mathrm d\Omega^\prime\int^{\infty}_{0}\mathrm dE^\prime\,\Sigma_s\!\!\left(\mathbf{r},E^\prime\rightarrow E,\mathbf{\hat{\Omega}}^\prime\rightarrow \mathbf{\hat{\Omega}},t\right)\psi(\mathbf{r},E^\prime,\mathbf{\hat{\Omega}^\prime},t)$$
$$\quad + s(\mathbf{r},E,\mathbf{\hat{\Omega}},t)$$

Where the equation for the precursors of delayed neutrons is as follows:

$\frac{\partial C_i}{\partial t}(\bold{r},t) =\tilde{\beta}_i(\bold{r})\int_0^\infty dE\nu_p(\bold{r},E)\Sigma_f(\bold{r},E,t)\phi (\bold{r},E,t) -\lambda_i(\bold{r})C_i(\bold{r},t),$

$\quad i=1,...,N$

All notations are as follows:

Symbol	Meaning	Comments
$\mathbf{r}$	Position vector (i.e. x, y, z)	
$E$	Energy	
$\mathbf{\hat{\Omega}}=\frac{\mathbf{v}(E)}{|\mathbf{v}(E)|}=\frac{\mathbf{v}(E)}{{v(E)}}$	Unit vector (solid angle) in direction of motion	
$t$	Time	
$\mathbf{v}(E)$	Neutron velocity vector	
$\psi(\mathbf{r},E,\mathbf{\hat{\Omega}},t)\mathrm dr\,\mathrm d\!E\,\mathrm d\Omega$	Angular neutron flux Amount of neutron track length in a differential volume $\mathrm dr$ about $r$, associated with particles of a differential energy in $\mathrm dE$ about $E$, moving in a differential solid angle in $\mathrm d\Omega$ about $\mathbf{\hat{\Omega}},$ at time $t.$	Note integrating over all angles yields scalar neutron flux $\phi \ = \ \int_{4\pi}\mathrm d\Omega\psi$
$\phi(\mathbf{r},E,t)\mathrm dr\,\mathrm dE$	Scalar neutron flux Amount of neutron track length in a differential volume $\mathrm dr$ about $r$, associated with particles of a differential energy in $\mathrm dE$ about $E$, at time $t.$	
$\nu_p(\bold{r},E)$	Average number of neutrons produced per fission at point $r$ with energy E, including both prompt and delayed neutrons. E.g., it is 2.43 for thermal neutrons (0.0253 eV) in U-235 at 293 K.	
$\chi_p(E)$	Probability density function for neutrons of exit energy $E$ from all neutrons produced by fission	
$\chi_{di}(E)$	Probability density function for neutrons of exit energy $E$ from all neutrons produced by delayed neutron precursors	
$\Sigma_t(\mathbf{r},E,t)$	Macroscopic total cross section, which includes all possible interactions	
$\Sigma_f(\mathbf{r},E^{\prime},t)$	Macroscopic fission cross section, which includes all fission interactions in $\mathrm dE^{\prime}$ about $E^{\prime}$	
$\Sigma_s\!\!\left(\mathbf{r},E'\rightarrow E,\mathbf{\hat{\Omega}}'\rightarrow \mathbf{\hat{\Omega}},t\right)\mathrm dE^\prime \mathrm d\Omega^\prime$	Double differential scattering cross section Characterizes scattering of a neutron from an incident energy $E^\prime$ in $\mathrm dE^\prime$ and direction $\mathbf{\hat\Omega^\prime}$ in $\mathrm d\Omega^\prime$ to a final energy $E$ and direction $\mathbf{\hat{\Omega}}.$	
$N$	Number of delayed neutron precursors	
$\lambda_i$	Decay constant for precursor i	
$C_i \left( \mathbf{r}, t \right)$	Total number of precursor i in $\mathbf{r}$ at time $t$	
$s(\mathbf{r},E,\mathbf{\hat{\Omega}},t)$	Source term	
$\tilde{\beta}_i(\bold{r})$	Weighted average of delayed neutrons: $\tilde{\beta}_i(\bold{r})=\frac{\int_0^\infty \beta_i(\bold{r},E)\nu_p(\bold{r},E)\Sigma_f(\bold{r},E)\phi(\bold{r},E)dE}{\int_0^\infty \nu_p(\bold{r},E)\Sigma_f(\bold{r},E)\phi(\bold{r},E)dE}$ Where $\beta_i(\bold{r},E)$ is the fraction of delayed neutrons emitted at $\mathbf{r}$ by precursors belonging to group $i$ produced by neutrons with energy $E$	
$\tilde{\beta}(\bold{r})$	$\sum_{i=1}^N\tilde{\beta}_i(\bold{r})$	

The transport equation can be applied to a given part of phase space (time t, energy E, location $\mathbf{r},$ and direction of travel $\mathbf{\hat{\Omega}}.$) The first term represents the time rate of change of neutrons in the system. The second terms describes the movement of neutrons into or out of the volume of space of interest. The third term accounts for all neutrons that have a collision in that phase space. The first term on the right hand side is the production of neutrons in this phase space due to fission, while the second term on the right hand side is the production of neutrons in this phase space due to delayed neutron precursors (i.e., unstable nuclei which undergo neutron decay). The third term on the right hand side is in-scattering, these are neutrons that enter this area of phase space as a result of scattering interactions in another. The fourth term on the right is a generic source. The equation is usually solved to find $\phi(\mathbf{r},E),$ since that will allow for the calculation of reaction rates, which are of primary interest in shielding and dosimetry studies.

== Neutron diffusion equation ==
In nuclear reactor physics, the neutron transport equation is often approximated by the neutron diffusion equation when doing 3-dimensional core calculations. The neutron diffusion equation is derived from the neutron transport equation by making a spherical harmonics expansion of the angular neutron flux and by assuming that

- the Legendre polynomials as functions of the neutron direction $\bold{\hat{\Omega}}$ are of degree less than or equal to 1,
- the neutron source is isotropic,
- the rate of change of the current density vector $\bold{J}(\bold{r},E,t)$ is much smaller than the frequency of collision and
- $\int_0^\infty \Sigma_{s1}(\bold{r},E'\to E,t)\bold{J}(\bold{r},E',t)dE'=\int_0^\infty \Sigma_{s1}(\bold{r},E\to E',t)\bold{J}(\bold{r},E,t)dE'$, where $\Sigma_{sl}(\bold{r},E'\to E,t)$ is the Legendre polynomial expansion coefficient of order $l$ of the macroscopic scattering cross section.

Further, assuming that the neutron speed is energy independent, the one-speed neutron diffusion equation is as follows:

$\frac{1}{v}\frac{\partial}{\partial t}\phi(\bold{r},E,t) = \bold{\nabla}\cdot D(\bold{r},E)\bold{\nabla}\phi(\bold{r},E,t) -\Sigma_t(\bold{r},E,t)\phi(\bold{r},E,t) +\int_0^\infty dE'\Sigma_{s0}(\bold{r},E'\to E,t)\phi(\bold{r},E',t)$$\qquad + \chi_p \left( \bold{r},E \right)\left[ 1-\tilde{\beta}(\bold{r}) \right]\int_0^{\infty} \mathrm dE^{\prime}\nu_p \left( \bold{r},E^{\prime} \right) \Sigma_f \left(\mathbf{r}, E^{\prime}, t \right) \phi \left( \mathbf{r}, E^{\prime}, t \right) + \sum_{i=1}^N \chi_{di}\left( \bold{r},E \right)\lambda_i C_i \left( \mathbf{r}, t \right) +s(\mathbf{r},E,t)$

Where $D(\bold{r},E)$ is the diffusion coefficient, $D(\bold{r},E)=\frac{1}{3\Sigma_{tr}(\bold{r},E)}$, with $\Sigma_{tr}(\bold{r},E)=\Sigma_t(\bold{r},E)-\bar{\mu}_s(\bold{r},E)\Sigma_s(\bold{r},E)$ the transport macroscopic cross section, and $\bar{\mu}_s$ the average cosine of the scattering angle. The equation for the precursors of delayed neutrons and all other notations are defined in the neutron transport equation section.

The multigroup diffusion equation can be obtained by discretizing the neutron energy domain:

$\frac{1}{v_g}\frac{\partial}{\partial t}\phi_g(\bold{r},t) = \bold{\nabla}\cdot D_g(\bold{r})\bold{\nabla}\phi_g(\bold{r},t) -\Sigma_{t,g}(\bold{r},t)\phi_g(\bold{r},t) +\sum_{g'=1}^G\Sigma_{s0,g'\to g}(\bold{r},t)\phi_{g'}(\bold{r},t)$$\qquad + \chi_{p,g} \left( \bold{r} \right)\left[ 1-\tilde{\beta}(\bold{r}) \right] \sum_{g'=1}^G \left(\nu \Sigma\right)_{f,g'} \left(\mathbf{r}, t \right) \phi_{g'} \left( \mathbf{r}, t \right) + \sum_{i=1}^N \chi_{di,g}\left( \bold{r} \right)\lambda_i C_i \left( \mathbf{r}, t \right) +s_g(\mathbf{r},t)$

Where:

$\phi_g(\bold{r},t)=\int_{E_g}^{E_{g-1}}dE\phi(\bold{r},E,t)$

$\frac{1}{v_g}=\frac{1}{\phi_g(\bold{r},t)}\int_{E_g}^{E_{g-1}}dE\frac{\phi(\bold{r},E,t)}{v(E)}$

$\bold{\nabla}\cdot D_g(\bold{r})\bold{\nabla}\phi_g(\bold{r},t) =\int_{E_g}^{E_{g-1}}dE\bold{\nabla}\cdot D(\bold{r},E)\bold{\nabla}\phi(\bold{r},E,t)$

$\Sigma_{t,g}(\bold{r},t)\phi_g(\bold{r},t) = \int_{E_g}^{E_{g-1}}dE\Sigma_t(\bold{r},E,t)\phi(\bold{r},E,t)$

$\Sigma_{s0,g'\to g}(\bold{r},t)\phi_{g'}(\bold{r},t) = \int_{E_g}^{E_{g-1}}dE\Sigma_{s0,g'\to g}(\bold{r},t)\phi_{g'}(\bold{r},t)$

$\chi_{p,g}(\bold{r})=\int_{E_g}^{E_{g-1}}dE\chi_p (\bold{r},E)$

$\left( \nu\Sigma\right)_{f,g}(\bold{r},t) \phi_g(\bold{r},t) = \int_{E_g}^{E_{g-1}}dE\nu(\bold{r},E)\Sigma_f(\bold{r},E,t) \phi (\bold{r},E,t)$

$\chi_{di,g}(\bold{r})=\int_{E_g}^{E_{g-1}}dE\chi_{di} (\bold{r},E)$

$G$ is the number of energy groups and $E_g$ is energy group $g$. The energy groups are ordered such that $E_g < E_{g-1}$.

=== Boundary conditions and extrapolation distance ===
Schematic of the neutron scalar flux near a planar vacuum boundary. The exact transport-theory flux does not vanish at the extrapolated boundary and remains constant in the vacuum for an infinite planar geometry.

Because the neutron diffusion equation is a differential equation, boundary conditions must be specified for a unique solution. Since the diffusion equation is only an approximation to the transport equation, the transport-theory boundary conditions serve as a guide, but they can only be satisfied approximately, because diffusion theory provides only the scalar flux $\phi$ and the current $\bold{J}$.

At an interface between two media with different cross sections, the scalar flux and the normal component of the neutron current are continuous: $\phi_1 = \phi_2$ and $\bold{J}_1 \cdot \mathbf{\hat{n}} = \bold{J}_2 \cdot \mathbf{\hat{n}}$

where $\mathbf{\hat{n}}$ is the unit normal to the interface; in one dimension, by Fick's law, this gives $-D_1 \frac{d\phi_1}{dx} = -D_2 \frac{d\phi_2}{dx}$.

At a vacuum (free) boundary, the transport-theory condition requires that no neutrons enter the region, i.e. the angular flux must vanish for all incoming directions. Diffusion theory approximates this by requiring that the inward partial current vanish at the boundary. In one dimension, with the boundary at $x = x_s$, this gives

$\left.\frac{d\phi}{dx}\right|_{x_s} = -\frac{\phi(x_s)}{2D}$

which is equivalent to saying that if the flux is extrapolated linearly beyond the boundary, it reaches zero a distance $2D = \frac{2}{3}\lambda_{tr}$ outside the physical boundary, where $\lambda_{tr} = 1/\Sigma_{tr}$ is the transport mean free path. In practice the condition above is often replaced by the simpler zero-flux condition at this extrapolated boundary, $\phi(x_s + 2D) = 0$. More accurate transport-theory calculations give an extrapolation length $z_0 = 0.7104\,\lambda_{tr}$ (about $2.13\,D$) for plane geometry. For curved boundaries the same $2D$ extrapolation is usually adequate, provided the radius of curvature is large compared with a mean free path.

These approximations are reliable only well inside the medium: close to the boundary the angular flux is anisotropic, so the diffusion-theory flux deviates from the exact flux, which remains nonzero beyond the extrapolated surface.

The same limitation applies at the surface of a strongly absorbing control rod. Diffusion theory does not predict the flux shape inside or very close to such a rod, so the diffusion calculation is normally carried out only in the surrounding medium with a transport result imposed as a surface ratio, often written as $J/\phi = \alpha$ at the surface or as zero flux at an extrapolation distance $d = D/\alpha$ inside the rod. For a fully absorbing (black) slab the transport result is $\alpha = 0.47$, while a partly absorbing (gray) slab uses a longer expression with exponential integrals; a black surface absorbs all incident thermal neutrons and a gray surface absorbs only some. The surface ratio then sets the effective absorption cross section homogenized over the control cell and used in whole-core diffusion calculations.

== Types of neutron transport calculations ==
Several basic types of neutron transport problems exist, depending on the type of problem being solved.

=== Fixed source ===
Fixed-source neutron transport calculation in water using OpenMC. Water fills both squares; gray regions indicate insufficient sampling, not a material boundary.

A fixed source calculation involves imposing a known neutron source on a medium and determining the resulting neutron distribution throughout the problem. This type of problem is particularly useful for shielding calculations, where a designer would like to minimize the neutron dose outside of a shield while using the least amount of shielding material. For instance, a spent nuclear fuel cask requires shielding calculations to determine how much concrete and steel is needed to safely protect the truck driver who is shipping it.

=== Criticality ===
Fission is the process through which a nucleus splits into (typically two) smaller atoms. If fission is occurring, it is often of interest to know the asymptotic behavior of the system. A reactor is called “critical” if the chain reaction is self-sustaining and time-independent. If the system is not in equilibrium the asymptotic neutron distribution, or the fundamental mode, will grow or decay exponentially over time.

Criticality calculations are used to analyze steady-state multiplying media (multiplying media can undergo fission), such as a critical nuclear reactor. The loss terms (absorption, out-scattering, and leakage) and the source terms (in-scatter and fission) are proportional to the neutron flux, contrasting with fixed-source problems where the source is independent of the flux. In these calculations, the presumption of time invariance requires that neutron production exactly equals neutron loss.

Since this criticality can only be achieved by very fine manipulations of the geometry (typically via control rods in a reactor), it is unlikely that the modeled geometry will be truly critical. To allow some flexibility in the way models are set up, these problems are formulated as eigenvalue problems, where one parameter is artificially modified until criticality is reached. The most common formulations are the time-absorption and the multiplication eigenvalues, also known as the alpha and k eigenvalues. The alpha and k are the tunable quantities.

K-eigenvalue problems are the most common in nuclear reactor analysis. The number of neutrons produced per fission is multiplicatively modified by the dominant eigenvalue. The resulting value of this eigenvalue reflects the time dependence of the neutron density in a multiplying medium.

- k_{eff} < 1, subcritical: the neutron density is decreasing as time passes;
- k_{eff} = 1, critical: the neutron density remains unchanged; and
- k_{eff} > 1, supercritical: the neutron density is increasing with time.

In the case of a nuclear reactor, neutron flux and power density are proportional, hence during reactor start-up k_{eff} > 1, during reactor operation k_{eff} = 1 and k_{eff} < 1 at reactor shutdown.

== Computational methods ==
Both fixed-source and criticality calculations can be solved using deterministic methods or stochastic methods. In deterministic methods the transport equation (or an approximation of it, such as diffusion theory) is solved as a differential equation. In stochastic methods such as Monte Carlo discrete particle histories are tracked and averaged in a random walk directed by measured interaction probabilities. Deterministic methods usually involve multi-group approaches while Monte Carlo can work with multi-group and continuous energy cross-section libraries. Multi-group calculations are usually iterative, because the group constants are calculated using flux-energy profiles, which are determined as the result of the neutron transport calculation.

=== Power iteration ===
K-eigenvalue problems are solved by an iterative scheme known as the power iteration, or source iteration, method. An initial guess for the fission source distribution is used to solve the transport equation for the neutron flux, from which a new fission source and an updated estimate of the eigenvalue are computed. The process is repeated until the changes in k and the source between successive iterations fall below a specified tolerance, at which point k has converged to the effective multiplication factor k_{eff} and the flux to the fundamental mode. The method is so named because the nth iterate results from applying the neutron production operator n times to the initial guess. In two- and three-dimensional or multi-group calculations these outer (source) iterations are nested with inner iterations that solve the linear system for each source estimate. In systems that are neutronically loosely coupled the convergence can be slow, and acceleration techniques have been devised to speed up such iterations.

=== Discretization in deterministic methods ===
To numerically solve the transport equation using algebraic equations on a computer, the spatial, angular, energy, and time variables must be discretized.

- Spatial variables are typically discretized by simply breaking the geometry into many small regions on a mesh. The balance can then be solved at each mesh point using finite difference or by nodal methods.
- Angular variables can be discretized by discrete ordinates and weighting quadrature sets (giving rise to the S_{N} methods), or by functional expansion methods with the spherical harmonics (leading to the P_{N} methods).
- Energy variables are typically discretized by the multi-group method, where each energy group represents one constant energy. As few as 2 groups can be sufficient for some thermal reactor problems, but fast reactor calculations may require many more.
- The time variable is broken into discrete time steps, with time derivatives replaced with difference formulas.

=== Computer codes used in neutron transport ===
==== Probabilistic codes ====
- COG – A LLNL developed Monte Carlo code for criticality safety analysis and general radiation transport.
- MCBEND – A Monte Carlo code for general radiation transport developed and supported by the ANSWERS Software Service.
- MCNP – A LANL developed Monte Carlo code for general radiation transport
- MC21 – A general-purpose, 3D Monte Carlo code developed at NNL.
- MCS – The Monte Carlo code MCS has been developed since 2013 at Ulsan National Institute of Science and Technology (UNIST), Republic of Korea.
- Mercury – A LLNL developed Monte Carlo particle transport code.
- MONK – A Monte Carlo Code for criticality safety and reactor physics analyses developed and supported by the ANSWERS Software Service.
- MORET – Monte-Carlo code for the evaluation of criticality risk in nuclear installations developed at IRSN, France
- OpenMC – An open source, community-developed open source Monte Carlo code
- Peacock - A proprietary, general-purpose, Monte Carlo particle transport code developed by Studsvik
- RMC – A Tsinghua University Department of Engineering Physics developed Monte Carlo code for general radiation transport
- SCONE – The Stochastic Calculator Of the Neutron Transport Equation, an open-source Monte Carlo code developed at the University of Cambridge.
- Serpent – A VTT Technical Research Centre of Finland developed Monte Carlo particle transport code
- Shift/KENO – ORNL developed Monte Carlo codes for general radiation transport and criticality analysis
- TRIPOLI – 3D general purpose continuous energy Monte Carlo Transport code developed at CEA, France
- UCN - Monte Carlo transport code for simulating experiments with ultracold neutrons developed at PNPI, Gatchina

==== Deterministic codes ====
- AGREE - A coupled thermal-neutronics high-temperature gas code developed by University of Michigan
- Ardra – A LLNL neutral particle transport code
- Attila – A commercial transport code
- DRAGON – An open-source lattice physics code
- PHOENIX/ANC – A proprietary lattice-physics and global diffusion code suite from Westinghouse Electric
- PARTISN – A LANL developed transport code based on the discrete ordinates method
- NEWT – An ORNL developed 2-D S_{N} code
- DIF3D/VARIANT – An Argonne National Laboratory developed 3-D code originally developed for fast reactors
- DENOVO – A massively parallel transport code under development by ORNL
- Jaguar – A parallel 3-D Slice Balance Approach transport code for arbitrary polytope grids developed at NNL
- DANTSYS
- RAMA – A proprietary 3D method of characteristics code with arbitrary geometry modeling, developed for EPRI by TransWare Enterprises Inc.
- RAPTOR-M3G – A proprietary parallel radiation transport code developed by Westinghouse Electric Company
- OpenMOC – An MIT developed open source parallel method of characteristics code
- MPACT – A parallel 3D method of characteristics code under development by Oak Ridge National Laboratory and the University of Michigan
- DORT – Discrete Ordinates Transport
- APOLLO – A lattice physics code used by CEA, EDF and Areva
- CASMO/SIMULATE – A proprietary lattice-physics and diffusion code suite developed by Studsvik for LWR analysis including square and hex lattices
- HELIOS – A proprietary lattice-physics code with generalized geometry developed by Studsvik for LWR analysis
- milonga – A free nuclear reactor core analysis code
- STREAM – A neutron transport analysis code, STREAM (Steady state and Transient REactor Analysis code with Method of Characteristics), has been developed since 2013 at Ulsan National Institute of Science and Technology (UNIST), Republic of Korea
- TINTE – A two-group diffusion code for the study of nuclear and thermal behavior of high temperature reactors, developed by Forschungszentrum Jülich in Germany.

== See also ==
- Nuclear reactor
- Boltzmann equation
- Neutron scattering
- Monte Carlo N-Particle Transport Code
