= Stieltjes transformation =

Mathematical transformation

In mathematics, the Stieltjes transformation S_{ρ}(z) of a measure of density ρ on a real interval I is the function of the complex variable z defined outside I by the formula

$$S_{\rho}(z)=\int_I\frac{\rho(t)\,dt}{t-z}, \qquad z \in \mathbb{C} \setminus I.$$

== Inverse formula ==
Under certain conditions we can reconstitute the density function ρ starting from its Stieltjes transformation thanks to the inverse formula of Stieltjes–Perron. For example, if the density ρ is continuous throughout I, one will have inside this interval
$$\rho(x) = \lim_{\varepsilon \to 0^+} \frac{S_{\rho}(x+i\varepsilon)-S_{\rho}(x-i\varepsilon)}{2i\pi}.$$

=== Derivation of formula ===
Recall from basic calculus that
$$\int_{-\infty}^\infty \frac{1}{x^2 + 1} dx =
\lim_{x\to\infty} \arctan x - \lim_{x\to-\infty} \arctan x =
\tfrac{\pi}{2} - (-\tfrac{\pi}{2}) =
\pi \text{.}$$
Hence $f(x) = \tfrac{1}{\pi} (x^2+1)^{-1}$ is the probability density function of a distribution—a Cauchy distribution. Via the change of variables $x = (t - t_0) / \varepsilon$ we get the full family of Cauchy distributions:
$$1 =
\int_{-\infty}^\infty \frac{1/\pi}{ x^2 + 1 } dx =
\int_{-\infty}^\infty \frac{1/\pi}{ (\frac{t-t_0}{\varepsilon})^2 + 1 } \frac{dx}{dt} dt =
\int_{-\infty}^\infty \frac{ \varepsilon/\pi }{ (t-t_0)^2 + \varepsilon^2 } dt$$
As $\varepsilon \to 0^+$, these tend to a Dirac distribution with the mass at $t_0$. Integrating any function $\rho(t)$ against that would pick out the value $\rho(t_0)$. Rather integrating
$$\int_{-\infty}^\infty \frac{ \varepsilon/\pi }{ (t-t_0)^2 + \varepsilon^2 } \rho(t) \, dt$$
for some $\varepsilon > 0$ instead produces the value at $t_0$ for some smoothed variant of $\rho$—the smaller the value of $\varepsilon$, the less smoothing is applied. Used in this way, the factor $\frac{ \varepsilon/\pi }{ (t-t_0)^2 + \varepsilon^2 }$ is also known as the Poisson kernel (for the half-plane).

The denominator $(t-t_0)^2 + \varepsilon^2$ has no real zeroes, but it has two complex zeroes $t = t_0 \pm i\varepsilon$, and thus there is a partial fraction decomposition
$$\frac{ \varepsilon/\pi }{ (t-t_0)^2 + \varepsilon^2 } =
\frac{ 1/2\pi i }{ t - (t_0 + i\varepsilon) } - \frac{ 1/2\pi i }{ t - (t_0 - i\varepsilon) }$$
Hence for any measure $\mu$,
$$\int_\mathbb{R} \frac{ \varepsilon/\pi }{ (t-x)^2 + \varepsilon^2 } d\mu(t) =
\frac{1}{2 \pi i} \int_\mathbb{R} \left( \frac{1}{t - (x + i\varepsilon)} - \frac{1}{t - (x - i\varepsilon)} \right) d\mu(t) =
\frac{ S_\mu(x + i\varepsilon) - S_\mu(x - i\varepsilon) }{ 2\pi i }$$
If the measure $\mu$ is absolutely continuous (with respect to the Lebesgue measure) at $x$ then as $\varepsilon \to 0^+$ that integral tends to the density at $x$. If instead the measure has a point mass at $x$, then the limit as $\varepsilon \to 0^+$ of the integral diverges, and the Stieltjes transform $S_\mu$ has a pole at $x$.

== Connections with moments of measures ==
If the measure of density ρ has moments of any order defined for each integer by the equality
$$m_{n}=\int_I t^n\,\rho(t)\,dt,$$

then the Stieltjes transformation of ρ admits for each integer n the asymptotic expansion in the neighbourhood of infinity given by
$$S_{\rho}(z)=\sum_{k=0}^{n}\frac{m_k}{z^{k+1}}+o\left(\frac{1}{z^{n+1}}\right).$$

Under certain conditions the complete expansion as a Laurent series can be obtained:
$$S_{\rho}(z) = \sum_{n=0}^{\infty}\frac{m_n}{z^{n+1}}.$$

== Relationships to orthogonal polynomials ==
The correspondence $(f,g) \mapsto \int_I f(t) g(t) \rho(t) \, dt$ defines an inner product on the space of continuous functions on the interval I.

If {P_{n}} is a sequence of orthogonal polynomials for this product, we can create the sequence of associated secondary polynomials by the formula
$$Q_n(x)=\int_I \frac{P_n (t)-P_n (x)}{t-x}\rho (t)\,dt.$$

It appears that $F_n(z) = \frac{Q_n(z)}{P_n(z)}$ is a Padé approximation of S_{ρ}(z) in a neighbourhood of infinity, in the sense that
$$S_\rho(z)-\frac{Q_n(z)}{P_n(z)}=O\left(\frac{1}{z^{2n+1}}\right).$$

Since these two sequences of polynomials satisfy the same recurrence relation in three terms, we can develop a continued fraction for the Stieltjes transformation whose successive convergents are the fractions F_{n}(z).

The Stieltjes transformation can also be used to construct from the density ρ an effective measure for transforming the secondary polynomials into an orthogonal system. (For more details see the article secondary measure.)

== See also ==
- Orthogonal polynomials
- Secondary polynomials
- Secondary measure
- Hilbert transform
