= Radiation Safety Information Computational Center =

U.S. Department of Energy Specialized Information Analysis Center (SIAC)

The Radiation Safety Information Computational Center (RSICC) collects, analyzes, maintains, and distributes computer software and data sets in the areas of radiation transport and safety. The RSICC is operated by Oak Ridge National Laboratory in Oak Ridge, Tennessee. The primary sponsors of the RSICC are the U.S. Department of Energy, the U.S. Department of Homeland Security, and the U.S. Nuclear Regulatory Commission.

The center began as the Radiation Shielding Information Center (RSIC) in 1962, but was renamed to RSICC in August 1996 to better reflect the scope of computer code technology at the center (i.e., radiation transport and safety).

The RSICC staff maintain an online software catalog at their website, which site visitors may browse (though no search functionality is provided). The software in the catalog cover a broad range of nuclear computational tools, providing in-depth coverage of radiation transport and safety topics for nuclear science and engineering, in support of modeling and simulation. Registered users may request software from the repository. With a few specific exceptions, a "cost recovery fee" is required to recoup the cost associated with RSICC operations before software requests are fulfilled.

The European counterpart to the RSICC is the Organisation for Economic Co-operation and Development's (OECD) Nuclear Energy Agency (NEA) Data Bank.

== See also ==
- Safety code (nuclear reactor)
