= Exponential integral =

Special function defined by an integral

Plot of the exponential integral function E_{2}(z) for complex z

In mathematics, the exponential integral $\operatorname{Ei}$ is a special function on the complex plane. It is defined as one particular definite integral of the ratio between an exponential function and its argument.

== Definitions ==
For real non-zero values of $x$, the exponential integral $\operatorname{Ei}(x)$ is defined as
$$\operatorname{Ei}(x) = -\int_{-x}^\infty \frac{e^{-t}}t\,dt = \int_{-\infty}^x \frac{e^t}t\,dt.$$

The Risch algorithm shows that $\operatorname{Ei}$ is not an elementary function. The definition above can be used for positive values of $x$, but the integral has to be understood in terms of the Cauchy principal value due to the singularity of the integrand at zero.

For complex values of the argument, the definition becomes ambiguous due to branch points at $0$ and $\infty$. Instead of $\operatorname{Ei}$, the following notation is used,
$$E_1(z) = \int_z^\infty \frac{e^{-t}}{t}\,  dt,\qquad|{\operatorname{Arg}}(z)|<\pi$$

Plot of the exponential integral function Ei(z) for complex z

For positive values of $x$, we have $-E_1(x) = \operatorname{Ei}(-x)$.

In general, a branch cut is taken on the negative real axis and $E_1$ can be defined by analytic continuation elsewhere on the complex plane.

For positive values of the real part of $z$, this can be written
$$E_1(z) = \int_1^\infty \frac{e^{-tz}}{t}\, dt = \int_0^1 \frac{e^{-z/u}}{u}\, du ,\qquad \Re(z) \ge 0.$$

The behaviour of $E_1$ near the branch cut can be seen by the following relation:
$$\lim_{\delta\to0+} E_1(-x \pm i\delta) = -\operatorname{Ei}(x) \mp i\pi,\qquad x>0.$$

== Properties ==
Several properties of the exponential integral below, in certain cases, allow one to avoid its explicit evaluation through the definition above.

=== Convergent series ===
Plot of E_{1} function (top) and Ei function (bottom).

For real or complex arguments off the negative real axis, $E_1(z)$ can be expressed as
$$E_1(z) = -\gamma - \ln z - \sum_{k=1}^{\infty} \frac{(-z)^k}{k\; k!} \qquad (\left| \operatorname{Arg}(z) \right| < \pi)$$
where $\gamma$ is the Euler–Mascheroni constant. The sum converges for all complex $z$, and we take the usual value of the complex logarithm having a branch cut along the negative real axis.

This formula can be used to compute $E_1(x)$ with floating point operations for real $x$ between $0$ and $2.5$. For $x > 2.5$, the result is inaccurate due to cancellation.

A faster converging series was found by Ramanujan:
$$\mathrm{Ei} (x) = \gamma + \ln x + \exp{(x/2)} \sum_{n=1}^\infty \frac{ (-1)^{n-1} x^n} {n! \, 2^{n-1}} \sum_{k=0}^{\lfloor (n-1)/2 \rfloor} \frac{1}{2k+1}$$

=== Asymptotic (divergent) series ===
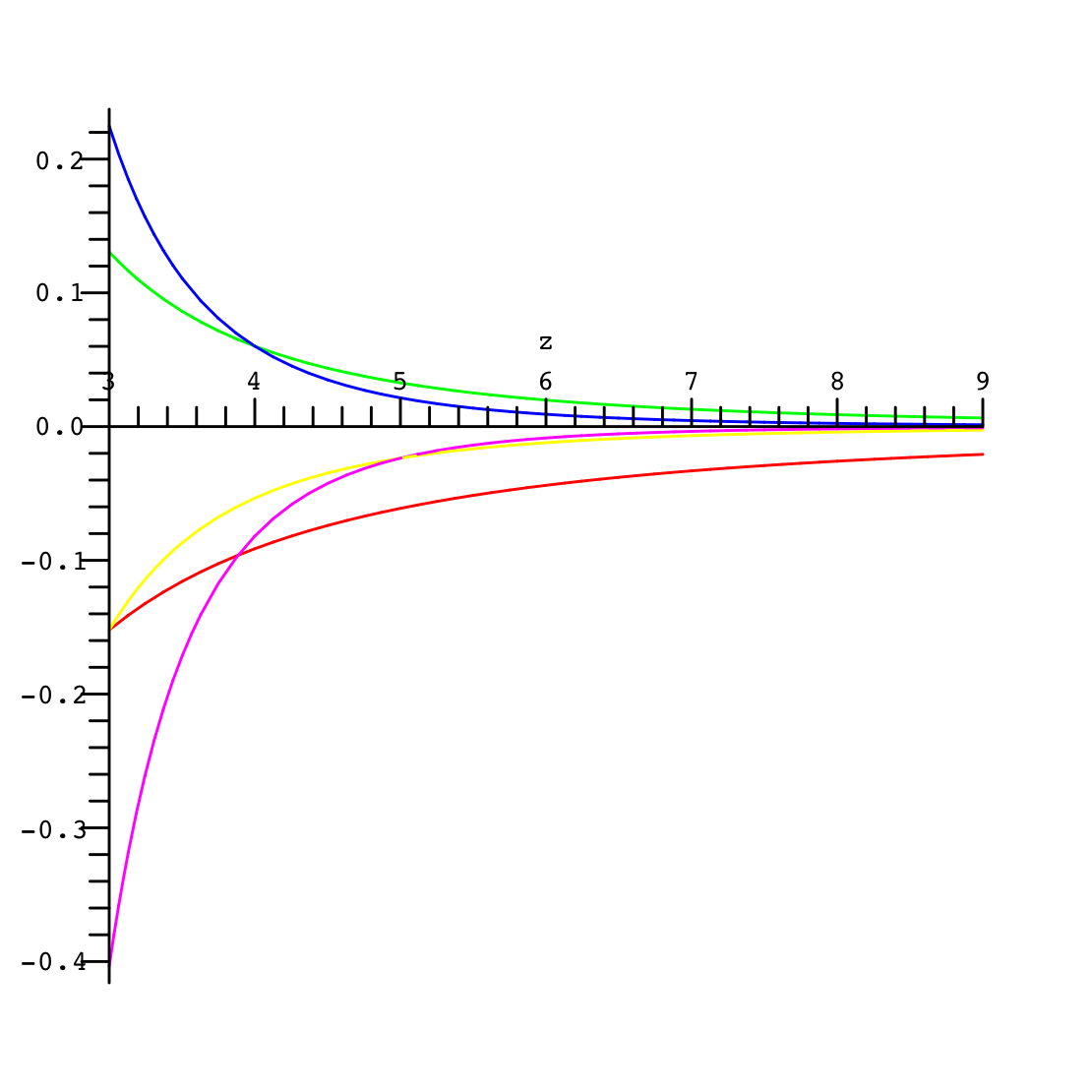
Relative error of the asymptotic approximation for different number N of terms in the truncated sum: N=1 (red), N=2 (green), N=3 (yellow), N=4 (blue), N=5 (pink).

The convergence of the series above is slow for arguments of larger modulus. For example, more than 40 terms are required to get an answer correct to three significant figures for $E_1(10)$. However, for positive values of $x$, there is a divergent series approximation that can be obtained by integrating $x e^x E_1(x)$ by parts:
$$E_1(x)=\frac{\exp(-x)} x \left(\sum_{n=0}^{N-1} \frac{n!}{(-x)^n} +O(N!x^{-N}) \right)$$
The relative error of the approximation above is plotted on the figure to the right for various values of $N$, the number of terms in the truncated sum ($N=1$ in red, $N=5$ in pink).

==== Asymptotics beyond all orders ====
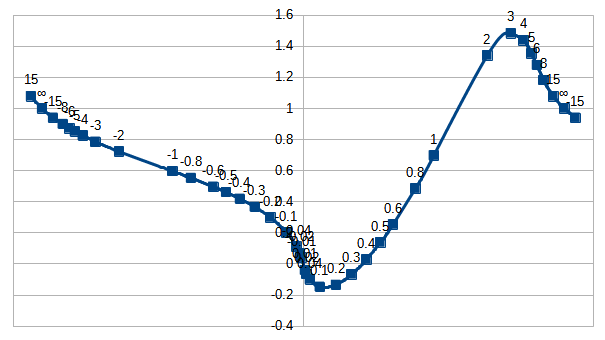
Normalized exponential integral. The value plotted is Ei(x)/((exp x)/x). The values of x are written above the corresponding point. The horizontal spacing is according to arctan x. The graph is extended "beyond infinity" a little on both the right and the left to show how the normalized function behaves when 1/x is small. (The horizontal spacing for these points corresponds to angles whose tangent is x.)

Using integration by parts, we can obtain an explicit formula
$$\begin{align}
\operatorname{Ei}(z) &= \frac{e^{z}} {z} \left (\sum _{k=0}^{n} \frac{k!} {z^{k}} + e_{n}(z)\right), \\
e_{n}(z) &\equiv (n + 1)!\ ze^{-z}\int _{ -\infty }^{z} \frac{e^{t}} {t^{n+2}}\,dt.
\end{align}$$
For any fixed $z$, the absolute value of the error term $|e_n(z)|$ decreases, then increases. The minimum occurs at $n\sim \vert z\vert$, at which point $\textstyle \vert e_{n}(z)\vert \leq \sqrt{\frac{2\pi } {\vert z\vert } }e^{-\vert z\vert }$. This bound is said to be "asymptotics beyond all orders".

=== Exponential and logarithmic behavior: bracketing ===
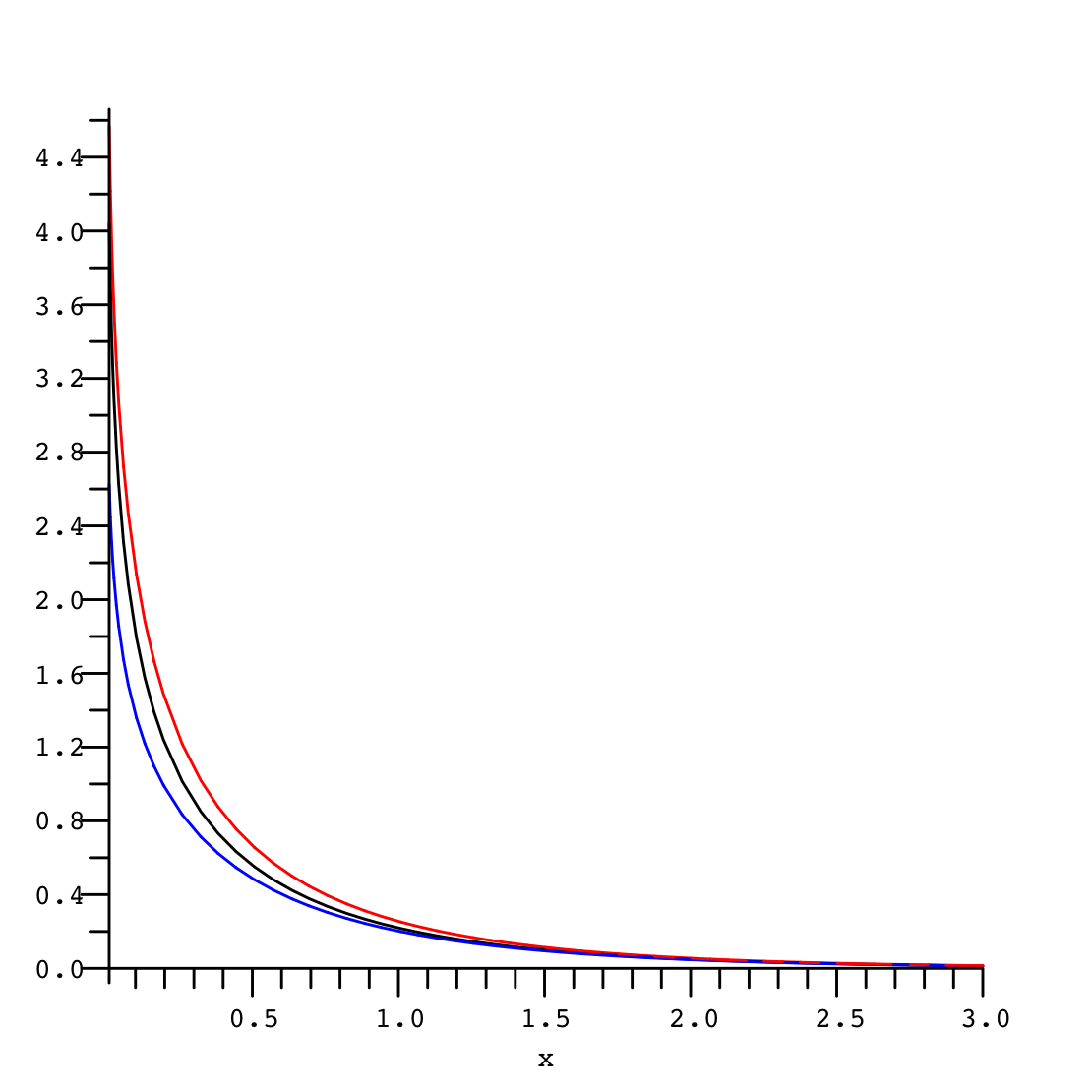
Bracketing of E_{1} by elementary functions

From the two series suggested in previous subsections, it follows that $E_1$ behaves like a negative exponential for large values of the argument and like a logarithm for small values. For positive real values of the argument, $E_1$ can be bracketed by elementary functions as follows:
$$\frac 1 2 e^{-x}\,\ln\!\left( 1+\frac 2 x \right)
< E_1(x) < e^{-x}\,\ln\!\left( 1+\frac 1 x \right)
\qquad x>0$$

The left-hand side of this inequality is shown in the graph to the left in blue; the central part $E_1(x)$ is shown in black and the right-hand side is shown in red.

=== Definition by Ein ===
Both $\operatorname{Ei}$ and $E_1$ can be written more simply using the entire function $\operatorname{Ein}$ defined as
$$\operatorname{Ein}(z)
= \int_0^z (1-e^{-t})\frac{dt}{t}
= \sum_{k=1}^\infty \frac{(-1)^{k+1}z^k}{k\; k!}$$
(note that this is just the alternating series in the above definition of $E_1$). Then we have
$$\begin{align}
E_1(z) &= -\gamma - \ln z + \operatorname{Ein}(z), && \left| \operatorname{Arg}(z) \right| < \pi; \\
\operatorname{Ei}(x) &= \hphantom{-}\gamma + \ln{x} - \mathrm{Ein}(-x), && x \neq 0.
\end{align}$$
The function $\operatorname{Ein}$ is related to the exponential generating function of the harmonic numbers:
$$\operatorname{Ein}(z) = e^{-z} \, \sum_{n=1}^\infty \frac {z^n}{n!} H_n$$

=== Relation with other functions ===
Kummer's equation
$$z\frac{d^2w}{dz^2} + (b-z)\frac{dw}{dz} - aw = 0$$
is usually solved by the confluent hypergeometric functions $M(a,b,z)$ and $U(a,b,z)$. But when $a=0$ and $b=1$, that is,
$$z\frac{d^2w}{dz^2} + (1-z)\frac{dw}{dz} = 0$$
we have
$$M(0,1,z)=U(0,1,z)=1$$
for all $z$. A second solution is then given by $E_1(-z)$. In fact,
$$E_1(-z)=-\gamma-i\pi+\frac{\partial[U(a,1,z)-M(a,1,z)]}{\partial a},\qquad 0< \operatorname{Arg}(z)<2\pi$$
with the derivative evaluated at $a=0$. Another connexion with the confluent hypergeometric functions is that $E_1$ is an exponential times the function $U(1,1,z)$:
$$E_1(z)=e^{-z}U(1,1,z)$$

The exponential integral is closely related to the logarithmic integral function $\operatorname{li}(e^x)$ by the formula
$$\operatorname{li}(e^x) = \operatorname{Ei}(x)$$
for non-zero real values of $x$.

The series expansion of the exponential integral immediately gives rise to an expression in terms of the generalized hypergeometric function ${}_2\!F_2$:
$$\operatorname{Ei}(x) = x{\,}_2\!F_2(1,1;2,2;x)+\ln x+\gamma.$$

=== Generalization ===
The exponential integral may also be generalized to
$$E_n(x) = \int_1^\infty \frac{e^{-xt}}{t^n}\, dt,$$
which can be written as a special case of the upper incomplete gamma function:
$$E_n(x) =x^{n-1}\Gamma(1-n,x).$$

The generalized form is sometimes called the Misra function $\varphi_m(x)$, (Note: After R. D. Misra; Misra & Born 1940, p. 178.) (Note: Many properties of this generalized form can be found in DLMF 8.19.) defined as
$$\varphi_m(x)=E_{-m}(x).$$

Including a logarithm defines the generalized integro-exponential function
$$E_s^j(z)= \frac{1}{\Gamma(j+1)}\int_1^\infty \left(\log t\right)^j \frac{e^{-zt}}{t^s}\,dt.$$

=== Derivatives ===
The derivatives of the generalised functions $E_n$ can be calculated by means of the formula
$$E_n '(z) = - E_{n-1}(z) \qquad (n=1,2,3,\ldots)$$
Note that the function $E_0$ is easy to evaluate (making this recursion useful), since it is just $\textstyle \frac{e^{-z} }{z}$.

=== Exponential integral of imaginary argument ===
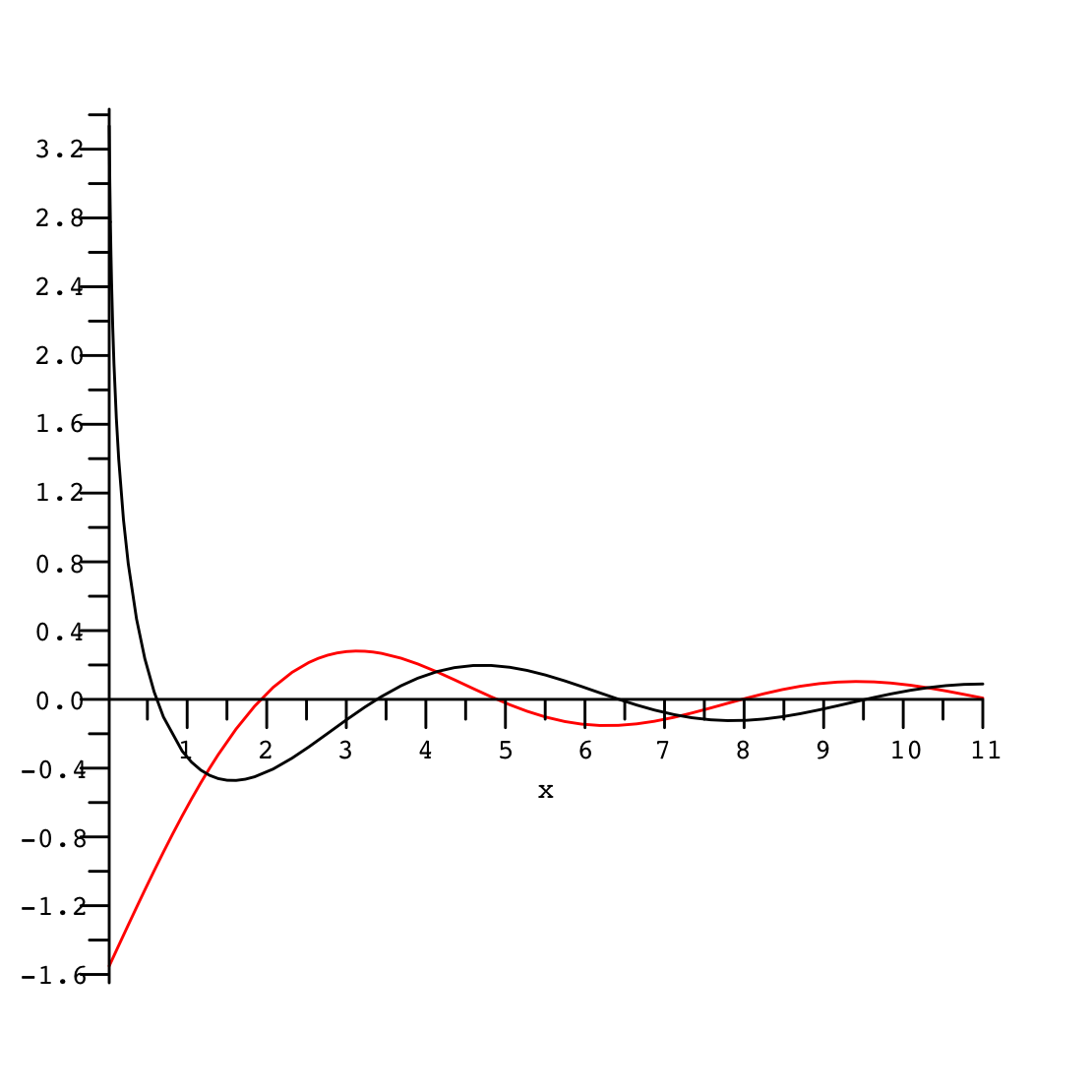
E_{1}(ix) against x; real part black, imaginary part red.

If $z$ is imaginary, it has a nonnegative real part, so we can use the formula
$$E_1(z) = \int_1^\infty
\frac{e^{-tz}} t \, dt$$
to get a relation with the trigonometric integrals $\operatorname{Si}$ and $\operatorname{Ci}$:
$$E_1(ix) = i\left[ -\tfrac{1}{2}\pi + \operatorname{Si}(x)\right] - \operatorname{Ci}(x)
\qquad (x > 0)$$
The real and imaginary parts of $E_1(ix)$ are plotted in the figure to the right with black and red curves.

=== Approximations ===
There have been a number of approximations for the exponential integral function. These include:

- The Swamee and Ohija approximation
  $$E_1(x) = \left (A^{-7.7}+B \right )^{-0.13},$$
  where
  $$\begin{align}
A &= \ln\left [\left (\frac{0.56146}{x}+0.65\right)(1+x)\right] \\
B &= x^4e^{7.7x}(2+x)^{3.7}
\end{align}$$
- The Allen and Hastings approximation
  $$E_1(x) = \begin{cases} - \ln x +\textbf{a}^\mathsf{T}\textbf{x}_5,&x\leq1 \\ \frac{e^{-x}} x \frac{\textbf{b}^\mathsf{T} \textbf{x}_3}{\textbf{c}^\mathsf{T}\textbf{x}_3},&x\geq1 \end{cases}$$
  where
  $$\begin{align}
\textbf{a} & \triangleq [-0.57722, 0.99999, -0.24991, 0.05519, -0.00976, 0.00108]^\mathsf{T} \\
\textbf{b} & \triangleq[0.26777,8.63476, 18.05902, 8.57333]^\mathsf{T} \\
\textbf{c} & \triangleq[3.95850, 21.09965, 25.63296, 9.57332]^\mathsf{T} \\
\textbf{x}_k &\triangleq[x^0,x^1,\dots, x^k]^\mathsf{T}
\end{align}$$
- The continued fraction expansion
  $$E_1(x) = \cfrac{e^{-x}}{x+\cfrac{1}{1+\cfrac{1}{x+\cfrac{2}{1+\cfrac{2}{x+\cfrac{3}{\ddots}}}}}}.$$
- The approximation of Barry et al.
  $$E_1(x) = \frac{e^{-x}}{G+(1-G)e^{-\frac{x}{1-G}}}\ln\left[1+\frac G x -\frac{1-G}{(h+bx)^2}\right],$$
  where:
  $$\begin{align}
h &= \frac{1}{1+x\sqrt{x}}+\frac{h_{\infty}q}{1+q} \\
q &=\frac{20}{47}x^{\sqrt{\frac{31}{26}}} \\
h_{\infty} &= \frac{(1-G)(G^2-6G+12)}{3G(2-G)^2b} \\
b &=\sqrt{\frac{2(1-G)}{G(2-G)}} \\
G &= e^{-\gamma}
\end{align}$$
  with $\gamma$ being the Euler–Mascheroni constant.

== Inverse function of the exponential integral ==
We can express the Inverse function of the exponential integral in power series form:
$$\forall |x| < \frac{\mu}{\ln(\mu)},\quad \operatorname{Ei}^{-1}(x) = \sum_{n=0}^\infty \frac{x^n}{n!} \frac{P_n(\ln(\mu))}{\mu^n}$$
where $\mu$ is the Ramanujan–Soldner constant and $(P_n)$ is polynomial sequence defined by the following recurrence relation:
$$P_0(x) = x,\ P_{n+1}(x) = x(P_n'(x) - nP_n(x)).$$

For $n > 0$, $\deg P_n = n$ and we have the formula:
$$P_n(x) = \left.\left(\frac{d}{dt}\right)^{n-1} \left(\frac{te^x}{\operatorname{Ei}(t+x)-\operatorname{Ei}(x)}\right)^n\right|_{t=0}.$$

== Applications ==
- Time-dependent heat transfer
- Nonequilibrium groundwater flow in the Theis solution (called a well function)
- Radiative transfer in stellar and planetary atmospheres
- Radial diffusivity equation for transient or unsteady state flow with line sources and sinks
- Solutions to the neutron transport equation in simplified 1-D geometries
- Solutions to the Trachenko–Zaccone nonlinear differential equation for the stretched exponential function in the relaxation of amorphous solids and glass transition

== See also ==
- Goodwin–Staton integral
- Bickley–Naylor functions
