= Chandrasekhar's X- and Y-function =

In atmospheric radiation, Chandrasekhar's X- and Y-function appears as the solutions of problems involving diffusive reflection and transmission, introduced by the Indian American astrophysicist Subrahmanyan Chandrasekhar. The Chandrasekhar's X- and Y-function $X(\mu),\ Y(\mu)$ defined in the interval $0\leq\mu\leq 1$, satisfies the pair of nonlinear integral equations

$$\begin{align}
X(\mu) &= 1+ \mu \int_0^1 \frac{\Psi(\mu')}{\mu+\mu'}[X(\mu)X(\mu')-Y(\mu)Y(\mu')] \, d\mu',\\[5pt]
Y(\mu) &= e^{-\tau_1/\mu} + \mu \int_0^1 \frac{\Psi(\mu')}{\mu-\mu'}[Y(\mu)X(\mu')-X(\mu)Y(\mu')] \, d\mu'
\end{align}$$

where the characteristic function $\Psi(\mu)$ is an even polynomial in $\mu$ generally satisfying the condition

$$\int_0^1\Psi(\mu) \, d\mu \leq \frac{1}{2},$$

and $0<\tau_1<\infty$ is the optical thickness of the atmosphere. If the equality is satisfied in the above condition, it is called conservative case, otherwise non-conservative. These functions are related to Chandrasekhar's H-function as

$$X(\mu)\rightarrow H(\mu), \quad Y(\mu)\rightarrow 0 \ \text{as} \ \tau_1\rightarrow\infty$$

and also

$$X(\mu)\rightarrow 1, \quad Y(\mu)\rightarrow e^{-\tau_1/\mu} \ \text{as} \ \tau_1\rightarrow 0.$$

== Approximation ==
The $X$ and $Y$ can be approximated up to nth order as

$$\begin{align}
X(\mu) &= \frac{(-1)^n}{\mu_1\cdots\mu_n}\frac{1}{[C_0^2(0)-C_1^2(0)]^{1/2}} \frac{1}{W(\mu)}[P(-\mu) C_0(-\mu)-e^{-\tau_1/\mu}P(\mu)C_1(\mu)],\\[5pt]
Y(\mu) &= \frac{(-1)^n}{\mu_1\cdots\mu_n}\frac{1}{[C_0^2(0)-C_1^2(0)]^{1/2}} \frac{1}{W(\mu)}[e^{-\tau_1/\mu}P(\mu) C_0(\mu)-P(-\mu)C_1(-\mu)]
\end{align}$$

where $C_0$ and $C_1$ are two basic polynomials of order n (Refer Chandrasekhar chapter VIII equation (97)), $P(\mu) = \prod_{i=1}^n (\mu-\mu_i)$ where $\mu_i$ are the zeros of Legendre polynomials and $W(\mu)= \prod_{\alpha=1}^n (1-k_\alpha^2\mu^2)$, where $k_\alpha$ are the positive, non vanishing roots of the associated characteristic equation

$$1 = 2 \sum_{j=1}^n \frac{a_j\Psi(\mu_j)}{1-k^2\mu_j^2}$$

where $a_j$ are the quadrature weights given by

$$a_j = \frac 1 {P_{2n}'(\mu_j)} \int_{-1}^1 \frac{P_{2n}(\mu_j)}{\mu-\mu_j} \, d\mu_j$$

== Properties ==
- If $X(\mu,\tau_1), \ Y(\mu,\tau_1)$ are the solutions for a particular value of $\tau_1$, then solutions for other values of $\tau_1$ are obtained from the following integro-differential equations

$$\begin{align}
\frac{\partial X(\mu,\tau_1)}{\partial \tau_1} &= Y(\mu,\tau_1)\int_0^1 \frac{d\mu'}{\mu'} \Psi(\mu') Y(\mu',\tau_1),\\
\frac{\partial Y(\mu,\tau_1)}{\partial \tau_1} + \frac{Y(\mu,\tau_1)}{\mu}&= X(\mu,\tau_1)\int_0^1 \frac{d\mu'}{\mu'} \Psi(\mu') Y(\mu',\tau_1)
\end{align}$$

- $\int_0^1 X(\mu)\Psi(\mu) \, d\mu = 1- \left[1-2\int_0^1 \Psi(\mu)\,d\mu + \left\{\int_0^1 Y(\mu) \Psi(\mu) \,d\mu\right\}^2\right]^{1/2}.$ For conservative case, this integral property reduces to $\int_0^1 [X(\mu)+Y(\mu)]\Psi(\mu) \, d\mu = 1.$
- If the abbreviations $x_n = \int_0^1 X(\mu) \Psi(\mu) \mu^n \, d\mu, \ y_n = \int_0^1 Y(\mu)\Psi(\mu) \mu^n \, d\mu, \ \alpha_n = \int_0^1 X(\mu)\mu^n \, d\mu, \ \beta_n = \int_0^1 Y(\mu) \mu^n \, d\mu$ for brevity are introduced, then we have a relation stating $(1-x_0)x_2 + y_0y_2 + \frac{1}{2} (x_1^2-y_1^2) = \int_0^1 \Psi(\mu)\mu^2 \, d\mu.$ In the conservative, this reduces to $y_0(x_2+y_2) + \frac{1}{2}(x_1^2-y_1^2)=\int_0^1 \Psi(\mu)\mu^2 \, d\mu$
- If the characteristic function is $\Psi(\mu)=a+b\mu^2$, where $a, b$ are two constants, then we have $\alpha_0=1+\frac{1}{2} [a(\alpha_0^2-\beta_0^2)+b(\alpha_1^2-\beta_1^2)]$.
- For conservative case, the solutions are not unique. If $X(\mu), \ Y(\mu)$ are solutions of the original equation, then so are these two functions $F(\mu)=X(\mu) + Q\mu [X(\mu) + Y(\mu)],\ G(\mu)=Y(\mu) + Q\mu[X(\mu)+Y(\mu)]$, where $Q$ is an arbitrary constant.

== See also ==
- Chandrasekhar's H-function
