= MELCOR =

- Developer: Sandia National Laboratories
- Stable release: MELCOR 2.2 / March 2024
- Operating system: Windows, MacOS, Linux
- Type: Accident modeling
- Website: www.sandia.gov/MELCOR/

MELCOR is a fully integrated, engineering-level computer code developed by Sandia National Laboratories for the U.S. Nuclear Regulatory Commission to model the progression of severe accidents in nuclear power plants. A broad spectrum of severe accident phenomena in both boiling and pressurized water reactors is treated in MELCOR in a unified framework. MELCOR applications include estimation of severe accident source terms, and their sensitivities and uncertainties in a variety of applications.

== Releases ==
Work on the MELCOR code began after the Three Mile Island accident in 1979. Sandia National Laboratories and the Nuclear Regulatory Commission (NRC) began studying topics such as "accident progression, combustible gas generation and transport, molten core concrete interaction, fuel coolant interactions." In the 1980s, the NRC directed Sandia to "consolidate these capabilities into one software package." Work on MELCOR itself began in 1982, and MELCOR had its first full release in 1989. MELCOR 1.8.3 was released to users in August 1994. By late 2000, four updated versions had been released, with copies of the software sold on CD.

The Department of Energy evaluated MELCOR according to its safety criteria in May 2004, after which, MELCOR V1.8.5 was "listed in DOE’s safety software Central Registry as a safety analysis toolbox code." MELCOR was used to study the Fukushima accident of 2011.

Under lead code developer Larry Humphries, researchers at Sandia continued to expand MELCOR in 2021, with the NRC continuing to use the code to study small modular reactors and non-light-water advanced reactors under development. Sandia released MELCOR 2.2_r2024.0 in March 2024, and was available for Windows, MacOS, and Linux.

== See also ==
- Nuclear engineering
- Monte Carlo method
- Nuclear reactor
- MCNP
