= Chandrasekhar's H-function =

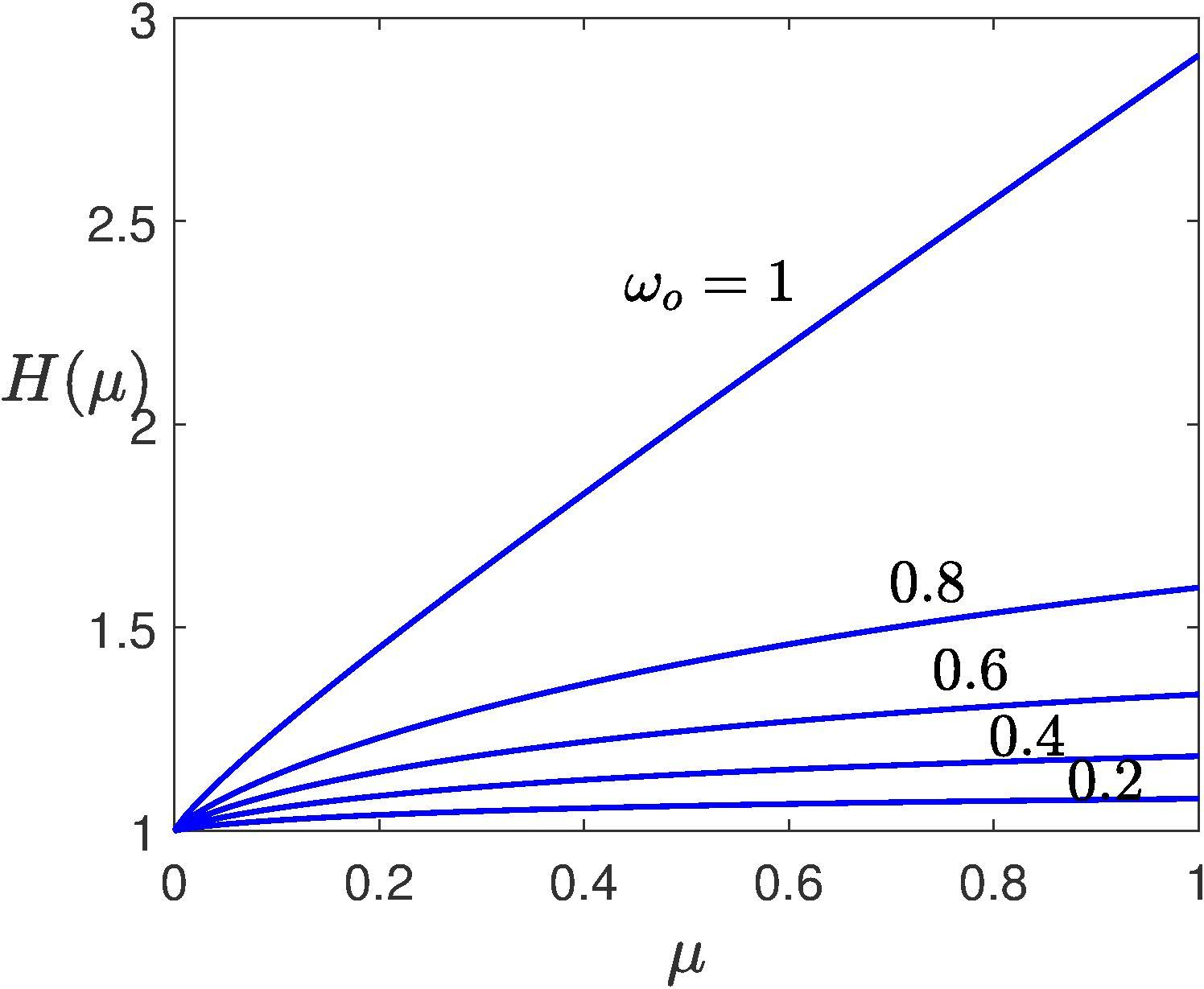
Chandrasekhar's H-function for different albedo

In atmospheric radiation, Chandrasekhar's H-function appears as the solutions of problems involving scattering, introduced by the Indian American astrophysicist Subrahmanyan Chandrasekhar. The Chandrasekhar's H-function $H(\mu)$ defined in the interval $0\leq\mu\leq 1$, satisfies the following nonlinear integral equation

$$H(\mu) = 1+\mu H(\mu)\int_0^1 \frac{\Psi(\mu')}{\mu + \mu'}H(\mu') \, d\mu'$$

where the characteristic function $\Psi(\mu)$ is an even polynomial in $\mu$ satisfying the following condition

$$\int_0^1\Psi(\mu) \, d\mu \leq \frac{1}{2}$$.

If the equality is satisfied in the above condition, it is called conservative case, otherwise non-conservative. Albedo is given by $\omega_o= 2\Psi(\mu) = \text{constant}$. An alternate form which would be more useful in calculating the H function numerically by iteration was derived by Chandrasekhar as,

$$\frac{1}{H(\mu)} = \left[1-2\int_0^1\Psi(\mu) \, d\mu\right]^{1/2} + \int_0^1 \frac{\mu'\Psi(\mu')}{\mu + \mu'}H(\mu') \, d\mu'$$.

In conservative case, the above equation reduces to

$$\frac{1}{H(\mu)}= \int_0^1 \frac{\mu' \Psi(\mu')}{\mu+\mu'}H(\mu')d\mu'$$.

== Approximation ==
The H function can be approximated up to an order $n$ as

$$H(\mu) = \frac{1}{\mu_1 \cdots \mu_n}\frac{\prod_{i=1}^n (\mu+\mu_i)}{\prod_\alpha (1+k_\alpha\mu)}$$

where $\mu_i$ are the zeros of Legendre polynomials $P_{2n}$ and $k_\alpha$ are the positive, non vanishing roots of the associated characteristic equation

$$1 = 2 \sum_{j=1}^n \frac{a_j\Psi(\mu_j)}{1-k^2\mu_j^2}$$

where $a_j$ are the quadrature weights given by

$$a_j = \frac{1}{P_{2n}'(\mu_j)}\int_{-1}^1 \frac{P_{2n}(\mu_j)}{\mu-\mu_j} \, d\mu_j$$

== Explicit solution in the complex plane ==
In complex variable $z$ the H equation is

$$H(z) = 1- \int_0^1 \frac z {z+\mu} H(\mu)\Psi(\mu) \, d\mu, \quad \int_0^1 |\Psi(\mu)| \, d\mu \leq \frac{1}{2}, \quad \int_0^\delta |\Psi(\mu)| \, d\mu \rightarrow 0, \ \delta\rightarrow 0$$

then for $\Re (z)>0$, a unique solution is given by

$$\ln H(z) = \frac{1}{2\pi i} \int_{-i\infty}^{+ i\infty} \ln T(w) \frac{z}{w^2-z^2} \, dw$$

where the imaginary part of the function $T(z)$ can vanish if $z^2$ is real i.e., $z^2 = u+iv = u\ (v=0)$. Then we have

$$T(z) = 1- 2 \int_0^1 \Psi(\mu) \, d\mu - 2 \int_0^1 \frac{\mu^2 \Psi(\mu)}{u-\mu^2} \, d\mu$$

The above solution is unique and bounded in the interval $0\leq z\leq 1$ for conservative cases. In non-conservative cases, if the equation $T(z)=0$ admits the roots $\pm 1/k$, then there is a further solution given by

$$H_1(z) = H(z) \frac{1+kz}{1-kz}$$

== Properties ==
- $\int_0^1 H(\mu)\Psi(\mu) \, d\mu = 1-\left[1-2\int_0^1\Psi(\mu) \, d\mu \right]^{1/2}$. For conservative case, this reduces to $\int_0^1 \Psi(\mu)d\mu=\frac{1}{2}$.
- $\left[1-2\int_0^1\Psi(\mu) \, d\mu\right]^{1/2} \int_0^1 H(\mu) \Psi(\mu) \mu^2 \, d\mu + \frac{1}{2} \left[\int_0^1 H(\mu)\Psi(\mu)\mu \, d\mu\right]^2 = \int_0^1 \Psi(\mu)\mu^2 \, d\mu$. For conservative case, this reduces to $\int_0^1 H(\mu)\Psi(\mu) \mu d\mu = \left[2\int_0^1 \Psi(\mu)\mu^2d\mu\right]^{1/2}$.
- If the characteristic function is $\Psi(\mu)=a+b\mu^2$, where $a, b$ are two constants(have to satisfy $a+b/3\leq 1/2$) and if $\alpha_n = \int_0^1 H(\mu)\mu^n \, d\mu, \ n\geq 1$ is the nth moment of the H function, then we have

$$\alpha_0 = 1 + \frac{1}{2} (a\alpha_0^2 + b \alpha_1^2)$$

and

$$(a+b\mu^2) \int_0^1\frac{H(\mu')}{\mu+\mu'}\,d\mu'=\frac{H(\mu)-1}{\mu H(\mu)}-b(\alpha_1-\mu\alpha_0)$$

== See also ==
- Chandrasekhar's X- and Y-function
