= Secondary polynomials =

In mathematics, the secondary polynomials $\{q_n(x)\}$ associated with a sequence $\{p_n(x)\}$ of polynomials orthogonal with respect to a density $\rho(x)$ are defined by

$q_n(x) = \int_\mathbb{R}\! \frac{p_n(t) - p_n(x)}{t - x} \rho(t)\,dt.$

To see that the functions $q_n(x)$ are indeed polynomials, consider the simple example of $p_0(x)=x^3.$ Then,

$$\begin{align} q_0(x) &{}
= \int_\mathbb{R} \! \frac{t^3 - x^3}{t - x} \rho(t)\,dt \\
&{}
= \int_\mathbb{R} \! \frac{(t - x)(t^2+tx+x^2)}{t - x} \rho(t)\,dt \\
&{}
= \int_\mathbb{R} \! (t^2+tx+x^2)\rho(t)\,dt \\
&{}
= \int_\mathbb{R} \! t^2\rho(t)\,dt
+ x\int_\mathbb{R} \! t\rho(t)\,dt
+ x^2\int_\mathbb{R} \! \rho(t)\,dt
\end{align}$$

which is a polynomial $x$ provided that the three integrals in $t$ (the moments of the density $\rho$) are convergent.

== See also ==
- Secondary measure
