= Bickley–Naylor functions =

Functions for thermal radiation in hot enclosures

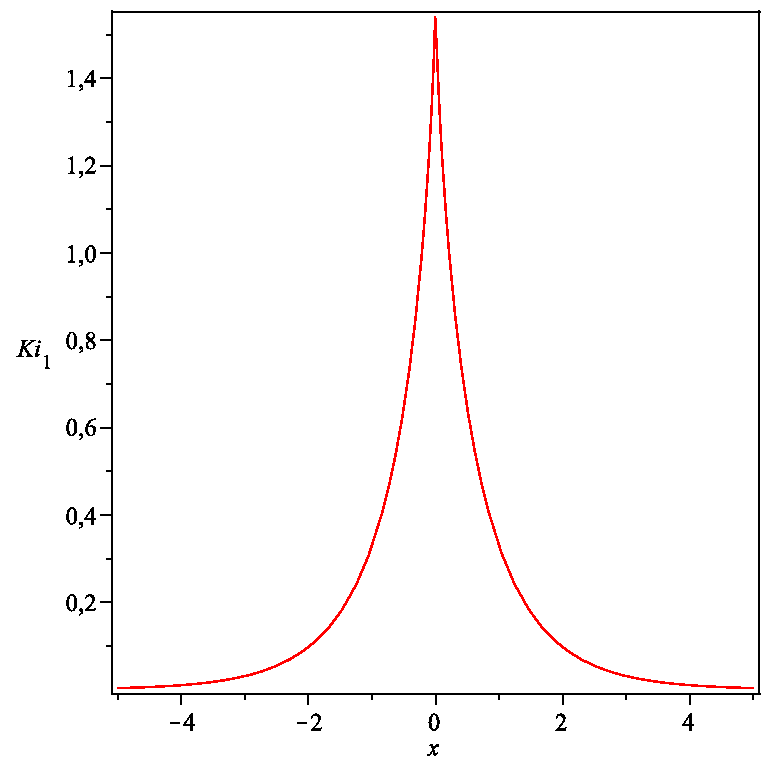

In physics, engineering, and applied mathematics, the Bickley–Naylor functions are a sequence of special functions arising in formulas for thermal radiation intensities in hot enclosures. The solutions are often quite complicated unless the problem is essentially one-dimensional (such as the radiation field in a thin layer of gas between two parallel rectangular plates). These functions have practical applications in several engineering problems related to transport of thermal or neutron, radiation in systems with special symmetries (e.g. spherical or axial symmetry). W. G. Bickley was a British mathematician born in 1893.

== Definition ==
The nth Bickley−Naylor function $\operatorname{Ki}_n(x)$ is defined by

$$\operatorname{Ki}_n (x) = \int_0^{\pi/2} e^{-x/\cos \theta}\cos^{n-1}\theta \, d\theta.$$

and it is classified as one of the generalized exponential integral functions.

All of the functions $\operatorname{Ki}_n(x)$ for positive integer n are monotonously decreasing functions, because $e^{-x}$ is a decreasing function and $\sin x$ is a positive increasing function for $x\in (0,\pi /2)$.

== Properties ==
The integral defining the function $\operatorname{Ki}_n(x)$ generally cannot be evaluated analytically, but can be approximated to a desired accuracy with Riemann sums or other methods, taking the limit as a → 0 in the interval of integration, [a, π/2].

Alternative ways to define the function $\operatorname{Ki}_n(x)$ include the integral, integral forms the Bickley-Naylor function:

$$\operatorname{Ki}_n (x) = \int_0^{\pi/2} e^{-x/\cos \theta}\cos^{n-1}\theta \, d\theta.$$

$$\operatorname{Ki}_n (x) = \int_0^\infty \frac{e^{-x\cosh t}}{\cosh^n t} \, dt.$$

$$\operatorname{Ki}_n (x)=\int_1^\infty \frac{e^{-xt}dt}{t^n \sqrt{t^2-1}}$$

$$\operatorname{Ki}_n (x) =\frac{1}{(n-1)!}\int_x^\infty (t-x)^{n-1}K_0(t)dt.$$

$$\frac{\operatorname{Ki}_n (x)}{x^n}=\frac{1}{(n-1)!}\int_1^\infty (t-1)^{n-1}K_0(xt)dt.$$

where $\operatorname{K}_0(x)$ is the modified Bessel function of the zeroth order. Also by definition we have $\operatorname{Ki}_0(x)=\operatorname{K}_0(x)$.

== Series expansions ==
The series expansions of the first and second order Bickley functions are given by:

$$\operatorname{Ki}_1 (x)=\frac{\pi}{2}+x\left(\gamma+\ln\left(\frac{x}{2}\right)\right) \sum_{k=0}^\infty\frac{(x^2/4)^k}{(k!)^2(2k+1)}-x \sum_{k=0}^\infty\frac{(x^2/4)^k}{(k!)^2(2k+1)^2} -x\sum_{k=1}^\infty\frac{(x^2/4)^kH_k}{(k!)^2(2k+1)}$$

$$\operatorname{Ki}_2 (x)=1-\frac{\pi}{2}x-\frac{x^2}{2}\left(\gamma+\ln\left(\frac{x}{2}\right)\right)\sum_{k=0}^\infty\frac{(x^2/4)^k}{k!(k+1)!(2k+1)}+\frac{x^2}{4}\sum_{k=0}^\infty\frac{(4k+3)(x^2/4)^k}{k!(k+1)!(2k+1)^2}+\frac{x^2}{2}\sum_{k=1}^\infty\frac{(x^2/4)^kH_k}{k!(k+1)!(2k+1)}$$

where γ is the Euler constant and

$$H_k=1+\frac{1}{2}+\frac{1}{3}+\ldots+\frac{1}{k}$$

is the $k$th harmonic number.

== Recurrence relation ==
The Bickley functions also satisfy the following recurrence relation:

$$n \operatorname{Ki}_{n+1}(x)=(n-1)\operatorname{Ki}_{n-1}(x)-x \operatorname{Ki}_n(x)+x \operatorname{Ki}_{n-2}(x),~~~~~n\ge 2$$

where $\operatorname{Ki}_0(x)=\operatorname{K}_0(x)$.

== Asymptotic expansions ==
The asymptotic expansions of Bickley functions are given as

$$\operatorname{Ki}_n(x)\sim\sqrt{\frac{\pi}{2x}}e^{-x}\left(1-\frac{(1+4n)}{8x}+\frac{3(3+24n+16n^2)}{12
8x^2}+\ldots\right)$$

for $x \gg 1$.

== Successive differentiation ==
Differentiating $\operatorname{Ki}_{n+1}(x)$ with respect to x gives

$$\frac{d}{dx}\operatorname{Ki}_{n+1}(x)=-\operatorname{Ki}_n(x)$$

Successive differentiation yields

$$\frac{d^n}{dx^n}\operatorname{Ki}_n(x)=(-1)^n\operatorname{K}_0(x)$$

The values of these functions for different values of the argument x were often listed in tables of special functions in the era when numerical calculation of integrals was slow. A table that lists some approximate values of the three first functions Ki_{n} is shown below.

| $x$ | $\operatorname{Ki}_1(x)$ | $\operatorname{Ki}_2(x)$ | $\operatorname{Ki}_3(x)$ |
|---|---|---|---|
| 0 | 1.570796327 | 1.000000000 | 0.785398162 |
| 0.1 | 1.22863188 | 0.862521290 | 0.692543328 |
| 0.2 | 1.023679877 | 0.750458533 | 0.612064472 |
| 0.3 | 0.868832269 | 0.656147929 | 0.541862953 |
| 0.4 | 0.745203394 | 0.575660412 | 0.480375442 |
| 0.5 | 0.643693806 | 0.506373657 | 0.426358257 |
| 0.6 | 0.558890473 | 0.446366680 | 0.378791860 |
| 0.7 | 0.487198347 | 0.394159632 | 0.336825253 |
| 0.8 | 0.426061805 | 0.348575863 | 0.299739399 |
| 0.9 | 0.373578804 | 0.308659297 | 0.266921357 |
| 1.0 | 0.328286478 | 0.273620752 | 0.237845082 |
| 1.2 | 0.254888907 | 0.21564418 | 0.189162878 |
| 1.4 | 0.199050709 | 0.17049927 | 0.150734408 |
| 1.6 | 0.156156459 | 0.135163924 | 0.120310892 |
| 1.8 | 0.122960838 | 0.107392071 | 0.096165816 |
| 2.0 | 0.097120592 | 0.085490579 | 0.076963590 |
| 2.5 | 0.054422478 | 0.048670845 | 0.044307124 |
| 3.0 | 0.030848237 | 0.027924583 | 0.025646500 |
| 3.5 | 0.017634408 | 0.016117448 | 0.014909740 |
| 4.0 | 0.010146756 | 0.009346971 | 0.008698789 |
| 4.5 | 0.005868829 | 0.005441695 | 0.005090280 |
| 5.0 | 0.003408936 | 0.003178387 | 0.002986247 |
| 6.0 | 0.001161774 | 0.001092877 | 0.001034238 |
| 7.0 | 0.000400052 | 0.000378912 | 0.000360620 |
| 8.0 | 0.000138841 | 0.000132222 | 0.000126417 |
| 9.0 | 0.000048484 | 0.000046377 | 0.000044509 |
| 10 | 0.000017015 | 0.000016336 | 0.000015728 |

== Computer code ==
Computer code in Fortran is made available by Amos.

== See also ==
- Exponential integral
