= Safety code (nuclear reactor) =

In the context of nuclear reactors, a safety code is a computer program used to analyze the safety of a reactor, or to simulate possible accident conditions.

== See also ==
- Monte Carlo N-Particle Transport Code
