= History of CAD software =

Computer-aided design software

Computer-aided design is the use of computers to aid in the creation, modification, analysis, or optimization of a design. Designers have used computers for calculations since their invention. CAD software was popularized and innovated in the 1960s, although various developments were made between the mid-1940s and 1950s. Digital computers were used in power system analysis or optimization as early as proto-"Whirlwind" in 1949. Circuit design theory or power network methodology was algebraic, symbolic, and often vector-based.

== 1940s–1950s ==
Between the mid-1940s and 1950s, various developments were made in computer software. Some of these developments include servo-motors controlled by generated pulse (1949), a digital computer with built-in operations to automatically coordinate transforms to compute radar related vectors (1951), and the graphic mathematical process of forming a shape with a digital machine tool (1952).

In 1953, MIT researcher Douglas T. Ross saw the "interactive display equipment" being used by radar operators, believing it would be exactly what his SAGE-related data reduction group needed. Ross and the other researchers from the Massachusetts Institute of Technology Lincoln Laboratory were the sole users of the complex display systems installed for the pre-SAGE Cape Cod system. Ross claimed in an interview that they "used it for their own personal workstation." The designers of these early computers built utility programs to ensure programmers could debug software, using flowcharts on a display scope, with logical switches that could be opened and closed during the debugging session. They found that they could create electronic symbols and geometric figures to create simple circuit diagrams and flowcharts. These programs also enabled objects to be reproduced at will; it also was possible to change their orientation, linkage (flux, mechanical, lexical scoping), or scale. This presented numerous possibilities to them.

Ross coined the term computer-aided design (CAD) in 1959.

== 1960s ==
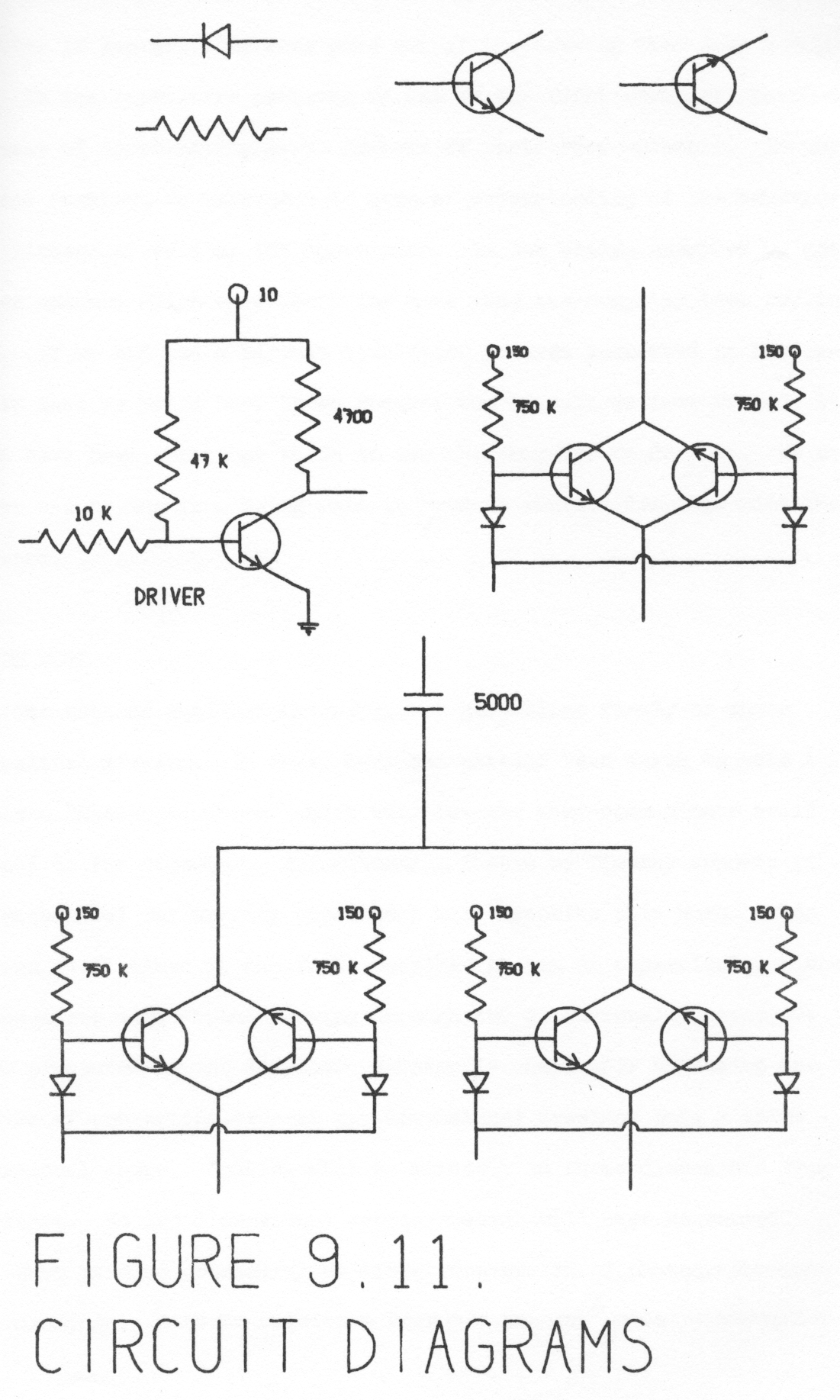
Early example of electronic CAD depicting transistor increasingly resembling point-contact transistor, from Sutherland's 1963 dissertation.

The invention of the 3D CAD/CAM is often attributed to French engineer Pierre Bézier (Arts et Métiers ParisTech, Renault). Between 1966 and 1968, after his mathematical work concerning surfaces, he developed UNISURF to ease the design of parts and tools for the automotive industry. UNISURF then became the working base for the following generations of CAD software.

In parallel, French carmaker Citroen had developed its design system SPAC (system de programmatic automatique Citroen) as part of its CAD/CAM solution SADUSCA (aid systems for the defining and the machining of bodywork surfaces), both based on the 1959 mathematical works of Paul de Casteljau. In 1968, it used an IBM 360-40, then 360-65 for batch jobs, but already had a graphical interface with an IBM 2250 prototype.

However, CAD may have been in use earlier at Boeing, having been used to help design the outer surface of Boeing's 727 airplane (which rolled out in 1962). Based on his human factors cockpit drawings, William Fetter from Boeing coined the term "computer graphic" in 1960. A computer graphics department was established in 1962, and by 1965 had begun to make movies by computer.

In the 1960s, technological developments in the industries of aircraft, automotive, industrial control, and electronics provided advancements in the fields of three-dimensional surface construction, NC programming, and design analysis. Most of these developments were independent of one another and often not published until much later. Some of the mathematical description work on curves was developed in the early 1940s by Robert Issac Newton. In his 1957 novel The Door into Summer, Robert A. Heinlein hinted at the possibility of a robotic Drafting Dan. However, more substantial work on polynomial curves and sculptured surface was done by mathematician Paul de Casteljau from Citroen; Pierre Bézier from Renault; Steven Anson Coons from MIT; James Ferguson from Boeing; Carl de Boor, George David Birkhoff and Garibedian from GM in the 1960s; and W. Gordon and R. Riesenfeld from GM in the 1970s.

The development of the Sketchpad system at MIT by Ivan Sutherland, who later created a graphics technology company with David Evans, was a turning point. The distinctive feature of Sketchpad was that it allowed a human to interact with a computer graphically; the design can be fed into the computer by drawing on a cathode ray tube (CRT) computer display (monitor) with a light pen. In effect, this feature of Sketchpad was a prototype for a graphical user interface, an indispensable feature of modern CAD. In 1963, under doctoral adviser Claude Shannon, Sutherland presented his PhD thesis paper, Sketchpad: A Man-Machine Graphical Communication System, at a Joint Computer Conference. In his paper, he said:

For drawings where motion of the drawing or analysis of a drawn problem is of value to the user, Sketchpad excels. For highly repetitive drawings or drawings where accuracy is required, Sketchpad is sufficiently faster than conventional techniques to be worthwhile. For drawings which merely communicate with shops, it is probably better to use conventional paper and pencil.

Over time, efforts would be directed toward the goal of having the designers' drawings communicate not just with shops, but also with the shop tool itself; however, it was a long time before this goal was achieved.

The first commercial applications of CAD were in large companies within the automotive and aerospace industries, as well as in electronics. This was because only large corporations could afford the computers capable of performing the necessary calculations. Notable company projects included a joint project between Patrick J. Hanratty from GM and Sam Matsa, Doug Ross's MIT APT research assistant from IBM, to develop a prototype system for design engineers, DAC-1 (Design Augmented by Computer) 1964, Lockheed projects, Bell GRAPHIC 1, and Renault.

One of the most influential events in the development of CAD was the founding of Manufacturing and Consulting Services Inc. (MCS) in 1971 by Patrick J. Hanratty, who wrote the system Automated Drafting And Machining (ADAM), but more importantly supplied code to companies such as McDonnell Douglas (Unigraphics), Computervision (CADDS), Calma, Gerber, Autotrol, and Control Data.

As computers became more affordable, the application of CAD gradually expanded into new areas. The development of CAD software for personal desktop computers was the impetus for almost universal application in all areas of construction.

== 1970s ==
Other notable events in the 1960s and 1970s include the foundation of CAD systems United Computing, Intergraph, IBM, and Intergraph IGDS in 1974 (which led to Bentley Systems MicroStation in 1984), as well as the Applicon in 1969 and commercial CAD systems from Japanese manufacturers Seiko and Zuken during the 1970s.

CAD implementations have evolved dramatically since this early development. Initially, with 3D in the 1970s, CAD was typically limited to producing drawings similar to hand-drafted drawings. Advances in programming and computer hardware, most notably solid modeling in the 1980s, have allowed more versatile applications of computers in design activities.

== 1980s ==
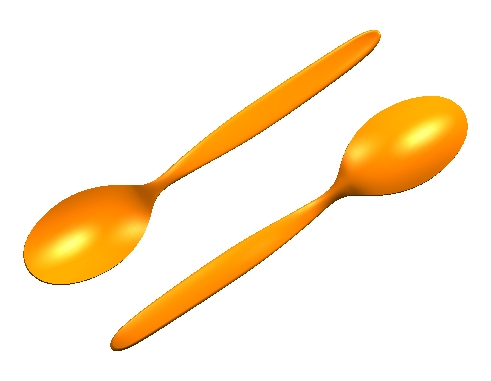
3D rendering of spoons in CAD software

In 1981, the key products were the solid modeling packages—Romulus (ShapeData) and Uni-Solid (Unigraphics) based on PADL-2—and the surface modeler CATIA (Dassault Systèmes). Autodesk was founded in 1982 by John Walker, which led to the two-dimensional system AutoCAD. The next milestone was the release of Pro/ENGINEER in 1987, which heralded greater usage of feature-based modeling methods and parametric linking of the parameters of features; this marked the introduction of parametric modeling.

== 1990s ==
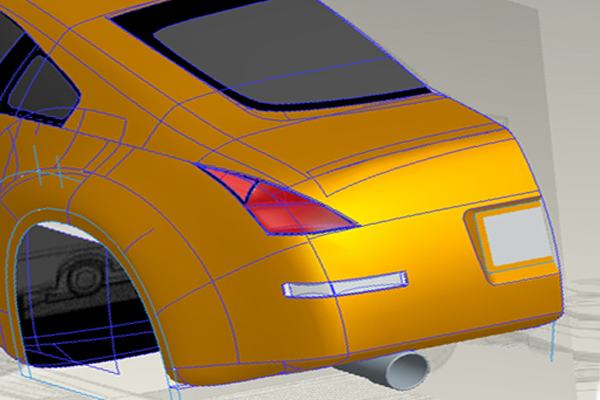
3D rendering of a car in CAD software with boundary representation

Also important to the development of CAD was the development in the late 1980s and early 1990s of B-rep solid modeling kernels (engines for manipulating geometrically and topologically consistent 3D objects), Parasolid (ShapeData), and ACIS (Spatial Technology Inc.). These developments were inspired by the work of Ian Braid. This subsequently led to the release of mid-range packages such as SolidWorks and TriSpective (later known as IRONCAD) in 1995, Solid Edge (then Intergraph) in 1996, and Autodesk Inventor in 1999. Between 1992-1998 Robert McNeel & Associates develop, based in the OPENNURBS Kernel, the 3D CAD Application called Rhinoceros 3D. An independent geometric modeling kernel has been evolving in Russia since the 1990s.

== 2000s ==
Availability of free and open-source CAD software and high costs of advanced and 3D CAD software may restrain the growth of the CAD software market. Free and open-source CAD software packages include FreeCAD, BRL-CAD developed for the US Army, QCAD Community Edition, LibreCAD and others.

== Chronology ==
CAD software:

- 1963: Sketchpad
- 1968: SADUSCA
- 1968: UNISURF
- 1977: MEDUSA
- 1977: CATIA
- 1978: Unigraphics, Solid Edge
- 1982: AutoCAD
- 1982: SDRC Ideas
- 1983: BRL-CAD
- 1987: Pro/ENGINEER
  - 2009: Creo
- 1995: SOLIDWORKS
- 1998: Rhinoceros 3D from Robert Mcneel & Associates
- 1999: QCAD
- 2002: FreeCAD
- 2004: BricsCAD
- 2007: NX
- 2011: LibreCAD
- 2016: Shapr3D
