= Shape Data =

UK software company

Shape Data Limited
- Type: Private
- Industry: Computer aided design
- Founded: 1 January 1974; 52 years ago in Cambridge, England
- Founder: Dr. Ian Braid; Dr. Alan Grayer; Dr. Charles Lang; Dr. Peter Veenman
- Defunct: 31 October 1991
- Headquarters: Cambridge, England

Shape Data Limited was a computer software company in Cambridge, England that specialised in developing programs for engineering and manufacturing professionals.

== Overview ==
Established in 1974 by several doctoral students of the University of Cambridge Computer Laboratory, the company was a pioneer in computer graphics with early industry advances in solid modelling design and boundary representation. The company revolutionised the computer aided design (CAD) industry in the 1970s and 1980s, by creating and commercialising the solid modelling software market in 1978. The use of solid modelling techniques allows for the automation of several difficult engineering calculations that were carried out as a part of Shape Data's software programs, including simulation, planning, and verification of design processes of three dimensional objects. Shape Data released a series of products that helped create the foundations of computer aided design programming, namely Romulus, Romulus-D, and Parasolid. The Parasolid program remains an industry standard for engineering departments and companies, in the design of manufacturing products from small scale tools and equipment to automobiles and aeroplanes.

Shape Data was sold several times to large multinational companies in the information technology industry. It ceased operating as a company in 1991, but its heritage continues within the Cambridge office of Siemens Digital Industries Software, a subsidiary of Siemens AG.

== History ==
=== University of Cambridge ===
Shape Data was founded in 1974 by Doctors Charles Lang, Ian Braid, Alan Grayer, and Peter Veenman. Veenman became the sole employee of the company at the time of its founding, while Lang, Braid, and Grayer initially continued work at the University of Cambridge Computer Laboratory. All four founders were doctoral students at the University of Cambridge. In 1965, Professor Maurice Wilkes and his graduate student Lang established the Computer Aided Design Group at the University of Cambridge Computer Laboratory. The initial purpose of the research group was to develop tools for building mechanical CAD/CAM systems. In particular, the group worked to engineer early forms of computational geometry, computer graphics, and software system components.

Early revenue for Shape Data came from business-to-business consultancies. In 1975, the company was contracted by the General Electric Company to develop a solid modeller based on the computational geometric work of Ian Braid's Ph.D thesis. In 1978, after three years of development, Shape Data released Romulus, the world's first commercialised solid geometric modeller software program.

By 1980, the company had expanded to about a dozen employees. The company was the target of a takeover bid by Weir Group, followed a year later by another takeover bid by Racal-Redac. In 1979, Shape Data reached an agreement with Evans and Sutherland of Salt Lake City, Utah to distribute Romulus in the United States. Evans and Sutherland President Dave Evans became interested in acquiring Shape Data, as the young company was seen as an entry point into advanced computer aided engineering. Concurrently, the company founders saw Evans and Sutherland as more favourable to the strategic development goals of their company and an opportunity to inject needed capital into Shape Data for further research and development of Romulus.

=== Evans and Sutherland ===
In 1980, Evans & Sutherland Computer Corporation entered into a contract with Shape Data to market the Romulus geometric modelling program. The company was sold to Evans & Sutherland in 1981. After acquisition, Evans & Sutherland injected a large amount of capital into Shape Data, allowing for rapid expansion of staff and procurement of computing equipment. In 1981, Shape Data had 17 employees. In 1983, the company had 40 and by 1986 staff had grown to 70.

In May 1984, the managing director position was created and Peter Veenman was appointed. At least two other solid modelling companies were formed in Cambridge at around this time by Shape Data alumni, Three-Space Limited and Perspective Design. By 1988, Shape Data was close to fragmenting.

In January 1988, Siemens agreed to buy Shape Data's Parasolid product and development group from the parent company. The administrative staff and the Romulus-D product and development group were left out of the deal. Also in 1988, Caterpillar committed to the Romulus-D program as the first major customer. Caterpillar discovered shortly thereafter that the rights to Parasolid, the geometric modelling kernel of Romulus-D, were being sold to Siemens. Caterpillar hastily arranged to take over financing Shape Data to prevent the sale of Parasolid.

=== McDonnell Douglas ===
Shape Data was sold to McDonnell Douglas Information Systems Limited on 31 October 1988. Ron Belcher, a senior software project manager at McDonnell Douglas, was appointed head of Shape Data at the time of the acquisition.

In 1989, Shape Data released Parasolid, a replacement for Romulus. This was the most advanced solid modelling kernel available on the market at the time.

=== EDS ===
In 1991, the McDonnell Douglas Systems Integration groups, including Shape Data, were acquired by EDS (then a part of General Motors Corp., now part of HP Enterprise Services). EDS branded the acquired business as EDS Unigraphics. Eventually, in 1997 EDS set up its Unigraphics division as a wholly owned subsidiary called Unigraphics Solutions.

The Shape Data name remained with McDonnell Douglas Information Systems in 1991, and was used thereafter by companies marketing the Glovia ERP software. In 1997, the company name was changed to Glova International Limited.

=== Siemens ===
Unigraphics Solutions, including the former Shape Data, was sold to Siemens AG on 24 January 2007. The Shape Data-descended products and teams now form parts of Siemens Digital Industries Software, a business unit of Siemens AG.

== Products ==
=== Romulus ===
The Romulus program was introduced in 1978 after three years of development. It was the first commercially licensed geometric modelling kernel in the world.

=== Parasolid ===
Parasolid, alongside ACIS, is the current industry standard for three-dimensional solid modelling kernel software. Shape Data released Parasolid in 1989, after four years of development.

== Key people ==
- Ron Belcher
- Ian Braid
- Alan Grayer
- Charles Lang
- Peter Veenman
- Chris Bowd

== See also ==
- McDonnell Douglas
- Siemens
- University of Cambridge Computer Laboratory
- UGS Corp.

== Bibliography ==
- Brebbia, C. A. (1982). Finite Element Systems: A Handbook (2nd ed.). Hampshire, UK: Springer-Verlag Berlin Heidelberg GmbH. ISBN 9783662072318.
- "Supershorts". Computerworld. No. 45. CW Communications, Inc. 1980.
- Rockwood, Alwyn P. (1984). Pickett, Mary; Boyse, John (eds.). Solid Modeling by Computers: From Theory to Applications. London, UK: Plenum Press. ISBN 9781461297307.
- VAX Software Source Book. Maynard, MA: Digital Equipment Corporation. 1986.
