= Schmidt coupling =

Type of coupling

Schmidt Coupling made and animated in OnShape

A Schmidt coupling is a type of coupling designed to accommodate large radial displacement between two shafts. Consisting of an arrangement of links and discs—three discs rotating in unison, interconnected in series by three or more links between each pair of discs—a Schmidt coupling can adapt to very wide variations in radial displacement while running under load. Couplings can be made to allow radial displacement greater than twice the radius of the discs.

== History ==
In 1960, NASA commissioned Richard Schmidt of Madison, Alabama, to develop a propulsion system for rockets in zero-gravity environments. One of the solutions suggested was a system of rotating discs with mass points positioned along their circumferences. To power these discs, Schmidt used rotating slider cranks similar to those used to transfer power to the wheels of a steam locomotive.

Similar disc-and-link arrangement had been known to German engineers for some time, but engineers could not make the theory work in practice because they erroneously assumed the center disc would require its own bearing. Schmidt found that the center disc could in fact assume its own center of rotation.

Schmidt further refined the design, creating a coupling system that guarantees a completely true angle of rotation at all times. Additionally, Schmidt's design eliminates the generation of net external forces, as its pushing and pulling forces alternate and overlap in a sinusoidal pattern.

In May 1963, Schmidt applied for a patent for his “coupling for precise angular transmission of rotational motion” at the Munich, Germany, patent office. The company SCHMIDT-KUPPLUNG GmbH was established in 1965 by Richard Schmidt and Walter Haarmann to sell the soon-to-be-patented Schmidt coupling. The patent for the Schmidt coupling, as it came to be known, was granted in February 1967. Schmidt couplings entered the United States coupling market place in 1984 when Zero-Max, Inc. acquired Schmidt Couplings, Inc. SCHMIDT-KUPPLUNG GmbH has entered the Indian market through their channel partner M/s. RSV Industries Private Limited located in Mumbai, India.

== Operation ==
In operation, all three discs of a Schmidt coupling rotate with equal velocity. The bearing-mounted connections of links to discs are spaced 120° apart on same-diameter pitch circles. The distance between the shafts can be varied steplessly between the minimum value and a maximum of twice the length of the links. While the coupling is undulating, there is no phase shift between shafts.

The constant-velocity relationship between input and output shafts joined by a Schmidt coupling is unaffected by changes in radial displacement. This relationship is similarly unaffected by initial radial reaction forces which could otherwise imbalance the system.

Schmidt couplings maintain constant velocity between the input and output shafts while the shafts undergo radial shifts in their relative positions.

If a Schmidt coupling is operating at high speed, the shafts must never become close to co-linear; when co-linear the lateral position of the middle disc is no longer fixed and it is free to oscillate around the shafts, causing extreme vibration in some situations.

== Schmidt coupling types ==
Schmidt couplings have been refined to come in several coupling designs, including the following:

Offset Shaft Couplings: Schmidt couplings which transmit constant angular velocity and torque in a wide range of parallel shaft misalignment and makes no side loads.

Semi flex Couplings: Semiflex coupling is a torsionally stiff and restoring-force-free precision coupling. In addition to the compensation of axial and angular displacements, it provides high radial displacement capacity together with compact design.

Inline Couplings: Schmidt couplings which accommodate the misalignment of small parallel shafts perpendicular with each other at constant angular velocity.

Control flex Couplings: Control flex is a precision coupling designed to meet the mechanical and metrological requirements of encoders. Through its unique function element, the compact shaft encoder coupling combines extremely low restoring force and low stress on the encoder bearings with constant angle-synchronous transmission of the rotary movement.

5D Couplings: A deviation of the Schmidt Inline Coupling which provide parallel shaft misalignment and a ±5° angular misalignment with large axial shaft displacement capabilities.

== See also ==
- Flexible shaft couplings
