= ShapeManager =

3D modeling kernel developed by Autodesk

Autodesk ShapeManager is a 3D geometric modeling kernel used by Autodesk Inventor and other Autodesk products that is developed inside the company. It was originally forked from ACIS 7.0 in November 2001, and the first version became available in Inventor 5.3 in February 2002. On the day of the announcement, VP of Autodesk, Robert Cross, denied that the genesis of ShapeManager was the purchase by Dassault Systèmes of Spatial Corp, producers of ACIS in July the previous year, though industry experts commented on Autodesk's exposure to dependence on technology controlled by its main competitor (Dassault owns SolidWorks).

The move was enabled by a clause in the 1990 contract between Autodesk and Spatial that made Autodesk a joint developer (with some restrictions) of the software with Spatial and provided an option to buy out of the contract to continue development of the source code on their own at a later date for $6.4 million.

Following this move, Dassault filed an injunction on 27 December 2001 for breach of contract against Autodesk and D-Cubed, the contractors who were then working on the kernel, on the technicality that these contractors had been allowed to access the source code. The lawsuit eventually came to an end on 2 October 2003 in favour of Autodesk after the jury had deliberated for under two hours and basically agreed with the videotaped testimony from Spatial's co-founder, Richard Sowar, who confirmed that D-Cubed had been contracted to work on various parts of the code by both companies throughout the decade without any suggestion of a breach of contract. Dassault's appeal that this evidence should not have been admitted to the court was also lost in 2006.
