= Romulus (modelling kernel) =

Solid modelling software

Romulus was a boundary representation (b-rep) solid modeling software library, released first in 1978 by Ian Braid, Charles Lang, Alan Grayer, and the Shape Data team in Cambridge, England. It was the first commercial solid modeling kernel designed for straightforward integration into computer-aided design (CAD) software. Romulus incorporated the CAM-I AIS (Computer Aided Manufacturers International's Application Interface Specification) and was the only solid modeler (other than its successors Parasolid and ACIS) ever to offer a third-party standard application programming interface (API) to facilitate high-level integration into a host CAD software program. Romulus was quickly licensed by Siemens, Hewlett-Packard (HP), and several other CAD software vendors.

Romulus was succeeded by Parasolid, which retains the capability to read Romulus data. Romulus support had ended by 1990.

== See also ==
- Comparison of computer-aided design software
- Shape Data
