= Jon Hirschtick =

Software developer and founder of SolidWorks

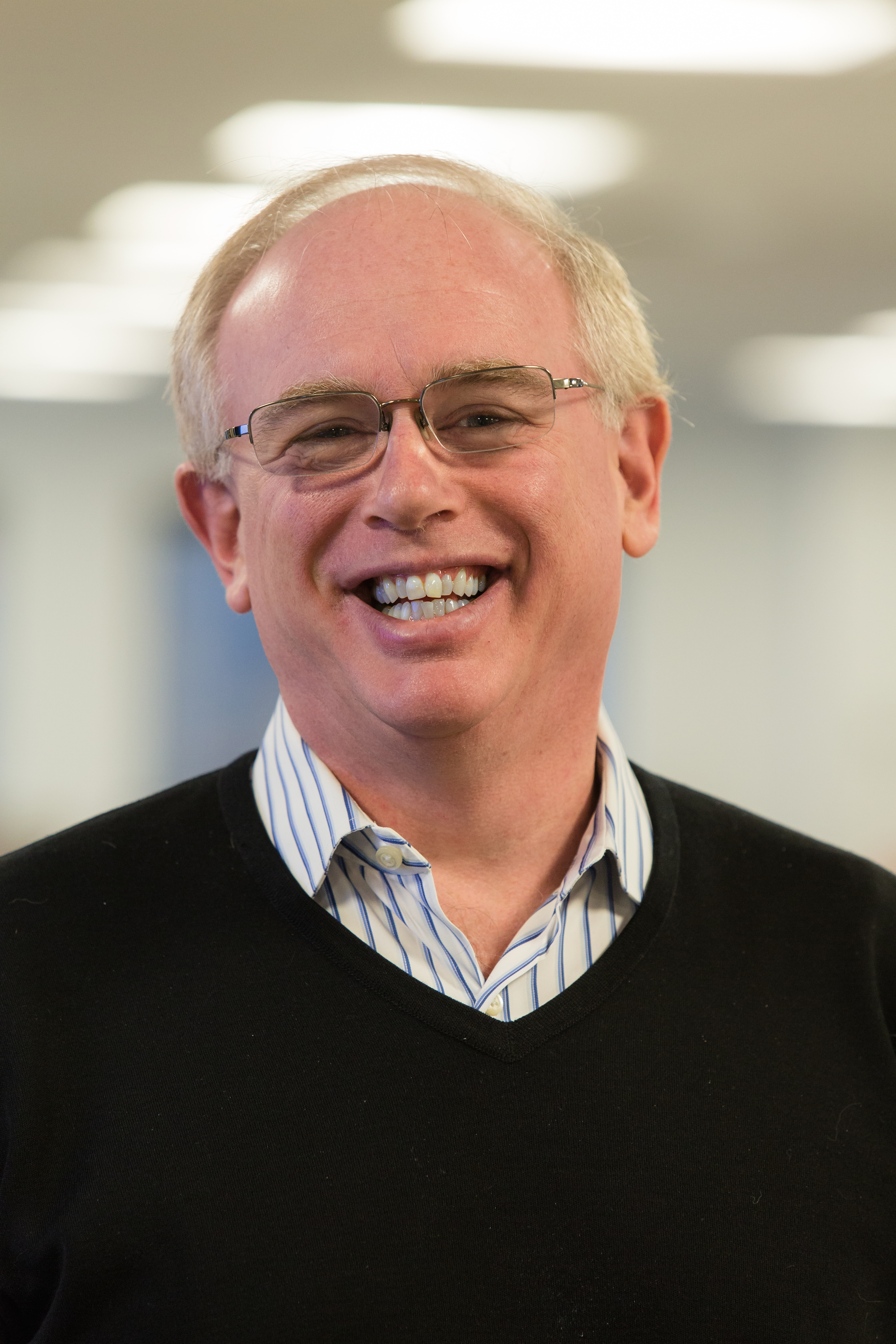
- Hirschtick in 2020
- Born: Chicago, U.S.
- Education: Bachelors and Masters from MIT
- Years active: 1987–present
- Title: CEO and Cofounder at Onshape
- Spouse: Randy Lyanne Gollub (m. 2011)

Jon Hirschtick is a CAD software developer, founder and former CEO of SolidWorks, a popular solid modeling 3D CAD and CAE system for Microsoft Windows, and Onshape, a cloud platform for product development that includes tools for CAD, data management, collaboration, workflow, analytics, etc.

== Education ==
Hirschtick holds a Bachelors and Master's degree in mechanical engineering from MIT, graduating in 1986.

== Career ==
Hirschtick was director of engineering at Computervision from 1991 to 1993, and a manager at the MIT CADLab. He was a player and instructor on the MIT Blackjack Team featured in the movies 21 and Breaking Vegas.

Hirschtick founded the SolidWorks Corporation in 1993 using $1 million he made while a member of the MIT Blackjack Team. Under his leadership, SolidWorks revenue eventually grew to $600 million. When Solidworks was acquired by Dassault Systèmes in 1997, Hirschtick continued on as CEO and then a group executive for the next 14 years. In October 2011, Hirschtick left Solidworks and in 2012 founded Belmont Technology (later changed to Onshape) with other members of the original SolidWorks team. Hirschtick is currently CEO at Onshape. In October 2019 Onshape entered into an agreement to be acquired by PTC.

Hirschtick was awarded the CAD Society Leadership Award, joining Autodesk’s Carl Bass, Dassault Systèmes’ Bernard Charles, and 3D Systems's Ping Fu, and is a recipient of the American Society of Mechanical Engineers Leadership Award. He is a member of the Advisory Board at Boston University and Arcbazar, where he was once director, and is an advisor to Magic Leap and MarkForged, Inc.
