= ASCON =

Russian developer of CAD and PDM software

ASCON Group
- Industry: Computer software CAD
- Founded: Leningrad, Soviet Union (1989; 37 years ago)
- Headquarters: St. Petersburg, Russia
- Area served: Worldwide
- Key people: Maxim Bogdanov (CEO)
- Number of employees: 651
- Website: ascon.net

ASCON (also ASCON Group, Russian: АСКОН) is a Russian developer of CAD and PDM software and a systems integrator headquartered in Saint Petersburg. The name of the company originates from an abbreviation of an "Automated System for Construction (Russian: Автоматизированная система конструирования).

== History ==
The company was founded in 1989 by Alexander Golikov and Tatyana Yankina who previously worked at KB Mashinostroyeniya in Kolomna. In 1993, ASCON signed its first major contract with Zheldorremmash which fueled its development.

By 2014, the company had over 7000 industrial customers including AutoVAZ, Severstal, Kazzinc, and others. On its home market, ASCON holds a dominant position over its core competitor Autodesk.

In 2015, Renga Architecture was released (working title — “Tornado”), a three-dimensional architectural and construction design system that enables the creation of 3D models of buildings and structures using commands familiar to designers (wall, column, beam, window, etc.). ASCON became a partner of Lin Industrial. Pilot-ICE received the Best Soft 2015 award from PC Magazine/RE.

== Subsidiaries ==
- C3D Labs
- DEXMA Labs
- Renga Software

== Sanctions ==
On November 2, 2023, the company was included in the US sanctions list. On February 23, 2024, the company was included in the sanctions list of the European Union and Canada for "developing engineering software for the production of missile systems in service with the Russian Armed Forces".
