= Geometric modeling kernel =

3D modeling software component

A geometric modeling kernel is a solid modeling software component used in computer-aided design (CAD) packages. Available modelling kernels include:

- ACIS is developed and licensed by Spatial Corporation of Dassault Systèmes.
- SMLib is developed by Solid Modeling Solutions.
- Convergence Geometric Modeler is developed by Dassault Systèmes.
- Parasolid is developed and licensed by Siemens.
- Romulus was a predecessor to Parasolid.
- ShapeManager is developed by Autodesk and was forked from ACIS in 2001.
- Granite is developed by Parametric Technology Corporation.
- C3D Modeler is developed by C3D Labs, part of the ASCON Group.
- CGAL is an open-source Computational Geometry Algorithms Library which has support for Boolean operations on Polyhedra; but no sweep, revolve or NURBS.
- Open CASCADE is an open-source modeling kernel.
- sgCore is a freeware proprietary modeling kernel distributed as an SDK.
- K3 kernel is developed by Center GeoS.
- SOLIDS++ is developed by IntegrityWare, Inc.
- APM Engine is developed by RSDC APM.
- KCM is developed and licensed by Kubotek Kosmos
- SvLis Geometric Kernel became opensource and discontinued, for Windows only.
- IRIT modeling environment, for Windows only.
- GTS GNU Triangulated Surface Library, for polygon meshes only and not surfaces.
- Russian Geometric Kernel.
- Geometry Kernel, a multi-platform C++ library with source code accessible for clients, developed and distributed by RDF - Geometry Kernel web site.
- SolveSpace has its own integrated parametric solid geometry kernel with a limited NURBS support.

== Kernel market ==
The kernel market currently is dominated by Parasolid and ACIS, which were introduced in the late 1980s. The latest kernel to enter the market is KCM. ShapeManager has no presence in the kernel licensing market and in 2001 Autodesk clearly stated they were not going into this business.

The world's newest geometric modeling kernel is Russian Geometric Kernel owned by the Russian government, and it is not clear if it is going to be commercially available, despite offering unique features over the other kernels on the market.

== Kernel developers ==
The table below contains a representative list of developers developing their own kernel or licensing the kernel from a third-party.

| Platforms | Domain | Kernel | Application | Developed by | Country |
|---|---|---|---|---|---|
| Windows | CAD, AEC | Open CASCADE | 4MCAD IntelliCAD | 4M S.A. | Greece |
| Windows | MCAD | ACIS / KCM | KeyCreator | Kubotek Kosmos | United States |
| Windows | MCAD | C3D | KOMPAS-3D | ASCON Group | Russia |
| Windows | AEC | C3D | KOMPAS-Builder | ASCON Group | Russia |
| Windows | CAD | C3D + K3 kernel | K3-Furniture | Center GeoS | Russia |
| Windows | AEC | C3D | Renga Architecture | ASCON Group | Russia |
| iPad, Windows | MCAD | Parasolid | Shapr3D | Shapr3D zrt. | Hungary |
| Android | MCAD | C3D | KOMPAS:24 | ASCON Group | Russia |
| Windows | CAD | C3D Modeler for Teigha Platform / ACIS | nanoCAD Plus | NanoSoft | Russia |
| Windows | MCAD | Parasolid | T-FLEX | Top Systems | Russia |
| Windows | MCAD | APM Engine | APM Studio | APM | Russia |
| Windows | CAM | C3D | TECHTRAN | NIP-Informatic | Russia |
| Windows | CAD | C3D | PASSAT | NTP Truboprovod | Russia |
| Windows, Mac | CAD, CAM | Own Kernel | Rhinoceros 3D | Robert McNeel and Associates | United States |
| Windows | CAD | C3D | ESPRIT Extra CAD | LO CNITI, Rubius | Russia |
| Windows | CAD | C3D | BAZIS System | BAZIS Center | Russia |
| Windows | CAE | Parasolid | Adams | MSC Software | United States |
| Windows | CAD, CAM, CAPP | switch from ACIS to C3D | ADEM | ADEM Group | Russia |
| Windows | CAE | Parasolid | ADINA Modeler | ADINA R&D Inc. | United States |
| Windows | CAD, AEC, GIS | ShapeManager | AutoCAD | Autodesk | United States |
| Windows | MCAD | ShapeManager | Inventor | Autodesk | United States |
| Windows, Mac | Solid Modeler & Machiner | ShapeManager | Autodesk Fusion | Autodesk | United States |
| Windows, Linux, Mac | MCAD, AEC | ACIS | BricsCAD | Bricsys | Belgium |
| Windows, Mac | CAD, CAM, CAE | Parasolid | Siemens NX | Siemens Digital Industries Software | United States, Germany |
| Windows | MCAD | Parasolid | SolidFace | SolidFace | United States, Brazil |
| Windows | MCAD | Parasolid (previous versions used ACIS) | Solid Edge | Siemens Digital Industries Software | United States, Germany |
| Windows | MCAD | Parasolid | SolidWorks | Dassault Systèmes | United States, France |
| Windows | AEC | Parasolid (previous versions used ACIS) | MicroStation | Bentley Systems | United States |
| Windows, Unix | CAD, CAM, CAE, AEC | Convergence Geometric Modeler | CATIA | Dassault Systèmes | France |
| Windows | Solid Modeler | GRANITE | Creo Elements | Parametric Technology Corporation | United States |
| Windows | CAD | GRANITE | Creo Parametric | Parametric Technology Corporation | United States |
| SaaS | Solid Modeler | Parasolid, FeatureScript | Onshape | Onshape | United States |
| Windows, SaaS | Solid Modeler | Parasolid & ACIS | IRONCAD | IRONCAD | United States |
| Windows | CAD | ACIS | GstarCAD | Suzhou Gstarsoft Co., Ltd | China |
| Windows, Mac | AEC, BIM | Own Kernel | ArchiCAD | Graphisoft | Hungary |
| Windows, Linux, Mac | MCAD, AEC | ACIS | ZW3D | ZWSoft | China |
| Windows | MCAD | ACIS | Cimatron | 3D Systems (Cimatron Ltd.) | Israel |
| Windows | MCAD | ACIS | SpaceClaim | ANSYS Inc | United States |
| Windows | MCAD | European Solid Modeller ESM | HiCAD | ISD Group | German |
| Mac, Windows | MCAD | ACIS | Cobalt, Xenon, Argon | Ashlar | United States |
| Windows, Linux | CAD Optimization | Own Kernel | CAESES | Friendship Systems | Germany |
| Windows, macOS, Linux, | CAD, CAM, BIM | Open Cascade, Coin3D, | FreeCAD | FreeCAD | |
| Windows, macOS, Linux, iOS, Android | CAD, AEC, BIM | Geometry Kernel | IFCEngine, STEPEngine | RDF | Bulgaria |
| Windows | CAD, AEC | Overdrive | ZW3D, ZWCAD | ZWSoft | China |
| Windows | CAD, Reverse Engineering | ACIS | Zeiss Reverse Engineering | ZEISS Industrial Metrology | Germany |
| Windows, macOS, Linux | MCAD | Parasolid | Plasticity | Plastic Software, LLC | United States |
