= Spatial Corp =

American software company, 1986–2000

Spatial Corp.
- Type: Private
- Industry: Computer software, 3D modeling
- Founded: 1986; 40 years ago
- Fate: Acquired by Dassault Systèmes, 2000
- Headquarters: Broomfield, Colorado, USA
- Parent: Dassault Systèmes (2000–present)
- Website: www.spatial.com

Spatial Corporation (formerly Spatial Technology Inc.) was founded in 1986, and had one main product: ACIS, the first commercially available 3D modeling kernel. Through subsequent years, Spatial added products to its portfolio that enabled independent software vendors (ISVs), mostly in the industries of computer-aided design (CAD) and computer-aided manufacturing (CAM), known as CAD/CAM, to build applications. These components included extensions and updates to the ACIS modeler, visualization products, and acquisitions in translator technology.

In late 2000, Dassault Systèmes purchased Spatial and made it a subsidiary.

== Flagship products ==
The firm's flagship products include these programs:

- 3D ACIS Modeler – features an open, object-oriented C++ architecture that enables robust, 3D modeling abilities. It is a geometric modeling kernel that was developed by Spatial, and is used in industries such as 3Danimation, shipbuilding, and computer-aided design.
- CGM Modeler – the 3D modeling kernel used in Dassault Systèmes’ 3DEXPERIENCE Platform.
- 3D InterOp – CAD data translation framework.
- 3D Visualization – the HOOPS 3D Application Framework enables the development of 3D Visualization applications with advanced 2D and 3D graphics functionality.
- 3D Precise Mesh – an object-based software development toolkit providing fully configurable surface and volumetric meshing abilities.
- Constraint Design Solver (CDS) – provides variational constraint solver solutions for design and engineering applications.
