= Regia (architecture) =

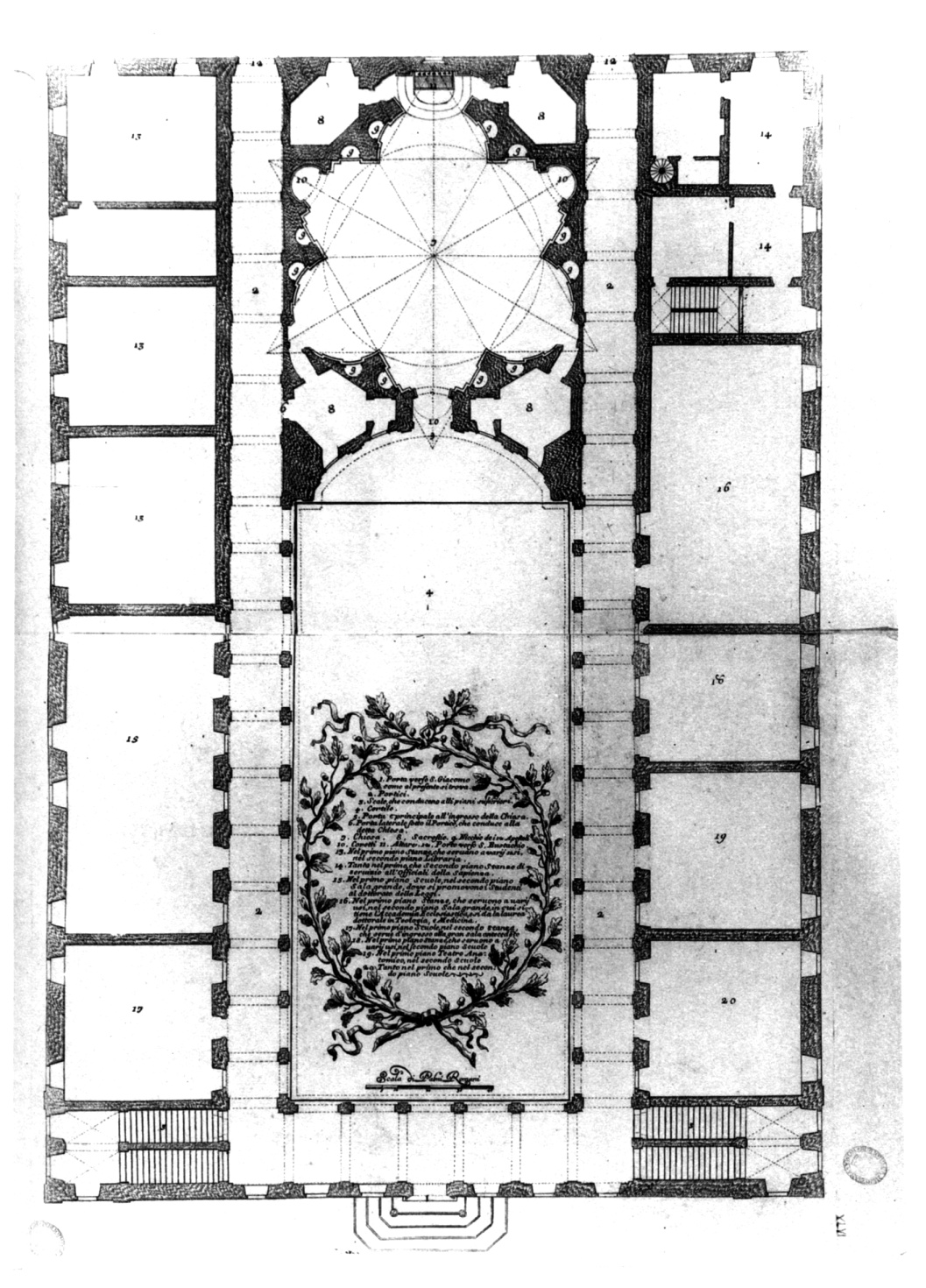
Plan of Francesco Borromini's Palazzo della Sapienza (1642–1660), originally the home of Sapienza University of Rome. As a place of authority, it is built according to the regia type.

Regia is a classical building type, a place where a governing authority resides. It is among the ancient building types. Others are the tholos, the temple, the theater, the dwelling, and the shop. Buildings according to this type may be rectangular in plan with an interior courtyard.
