= Onshape =

Computer-aided design software system

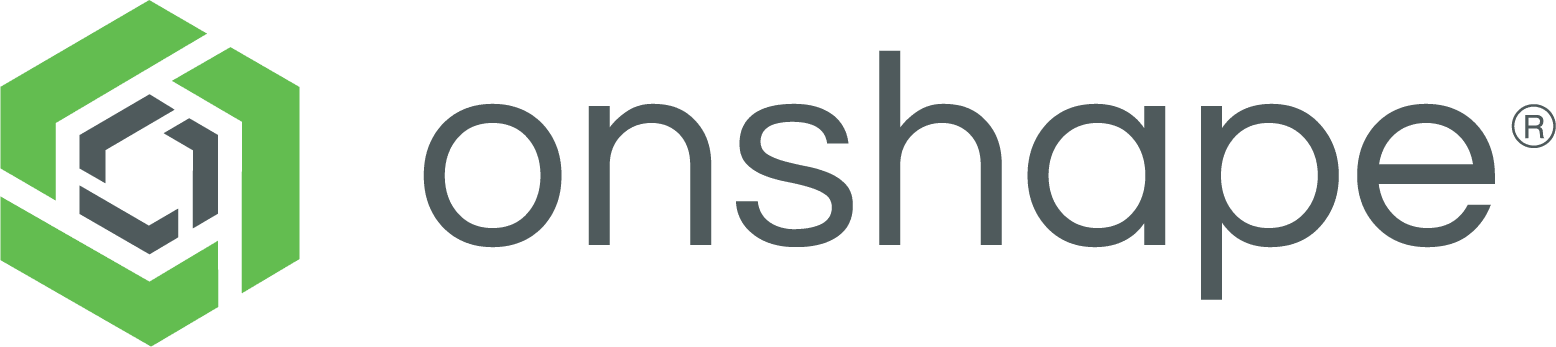

- The Onshape CAD system allows multiple users to access and work on a single design concurrently over the cloud, using any computer, tablet or phone.
- Developer: PTC
- Operating system: iOS, Android, Linux, macOS, Windows
- Available in: English, German, Korean, Chinese Traditional, Chinese Simplified, Japanese, Spanish, French, Italian
- Type: CAD
- Website: onshape.com

Onshape is a computer-aided design (CAD) software system, delivered over the Internet via a software as a service (SaaS) model. It makes extensive use of cloud computing, with compute-intensive processing and rendering performed on Internet-based servers, and users are able to interact with the system via a web browser or the iOS and Android apps. As a SaaS system, Onshape upgrades are released directly to the web interface, and the software does not require maintenance by the user.

Onshape allows teams to collaborate on a single shared design, the same way multiple writers can work together editing a shared document via cloud services. It is primarily focused on mechanical CAD (MCAD) and is used for product and machinery design across many industries, including consumer electronics, mechanical machinery, medical devices, 3D printing, machine parts, and industrial equipment.

As of 2025, Onshape is popularly used as a CAD suite for the FIRST Robotics Competition\FIRST Robotics Competition (FRC) alongside the FRCDesignApp (formerly MKCad) application available in the Onshape App Store.

== Company history ==
Onshape was developed by a company with the same name. Founded in 2012, Onshape was based in Cambridge, Massachusetts (USA), with offices in Singapore and Pune, India. Its leadership team includes several engineers and executives who originated from SolidWorks, a popular 3D CAD program that runs on Microsoft Windows. Onshape’s co-founders include two former SolidWorks CEOs, Jon Hirschtick and John McEleney.

- In November 2012, former SolidWorks CEOs Jon Hirschtick and John McEleney led six co-founders launching Belmont Technology, a placeholder name that was later changed to Onshape. The company’s first round of funding was $9 million from North Bridge Venture Partners and Commonwealth Capital.
- In March 2015, Onshape released the public beta version of its cloud CAD software, after pre-production testing with more than a thousand CAD professionals in 52 countries. Included in the beta launch was Onshape for iPhone.
- In August 2015, the company released its Onshape for Android app.
- In December 2015, Onshape launched its full commercial release. The company also launched the Onshape App Store, offering CAM, simulation, rendering and other cloud-based engineering tools. The Onshape App Store was launched with 24 developer partners.
- In April 2016, Onshape introduced its Education Plan, with a free version of Onshape Professional geared for college students and educators.
- In May 2016, Onshape released FeatureScript, a new open source (MIT licensed) programming language for creating and customizing CAD features.
- In October 2019, Onshape agreed to be acquired by PTC. The acquisition closed in November 2019 for $470 million.
- In February 2024, Onshape released iOS support for the Apple Vision Pro, allowing for real world applications of CAD models and prototypes.
- In January 2025, Onshape released the CAM studio, allowing users to generate G-code for up to 5-axis Simultaneous milling.

== Funding ==
Onshape was a venture-backed company with investments from firms including Andreessen Horowitz, Commonwealth Capital Ventures, New Enterprise Associates (NEA) and North Bridge Venture Partners. Total venture funding amounted to $169 million.

== Supported file formats ==
=== Modelling ===
==== Importing ====
As of May 2025, Onshape supported importing (opening) the following common CAD file formats:

- Parasolid X_T (Preferred)
- STEP (ISO 10303)
- ISO JT (ISO 14306)
- ACIS
- IGES
- CATIA v4, v5, v6
- Autodesk Inventor
  - Part (.IPT)
  - Assembly (.IAM)
  - Presentation (.IPN)
  - Drawing (.IDW)
- Pro/ENGINEER, Creo
- Rhinoceros 3D: .3dm
- .STL
- .OBJ
- SolidWorks file formats
- Siemens NX file formats
- Drawings (.DXF/.DWG)

==== Exporting ====
Onshape supports exporting to the following formats:

- STEP (ISO 10303)
- Parasolid XT
- ACIS
- IGES
- SolidWorks file formats
- .STL
- Rhinoceros 3D: .3dm
- Collada XML-spec based textual file

=== Drawing ===
Ordinary engineering or technical drawing can be exported as .PDF file.

=== Other Formats ===
In addition to CAD file formats, Onshape supports importing some Non-CAD file formats for viewing and referencing.

=== Assembly ===
Assemblies can be imported and exported to:

- STEP (ISO 10303)
- Parasolid XT
- ACIS
- Pro/ENGINEER, Creo
- ISO JT
- Rhinoceros 3D: .3dm
- Siemens NX file formats
- SolidWorks Pack and Go zip file

File formats that assemblies can be only-exported to, are:

- IGES
- .STL
- Collada XML-spec based textual file

== See also ==
- Comparison of CAD software
- WebGL
- List of 3D printing software
