= Zheldorremmash =

Russian locomotive repair and maintenance company

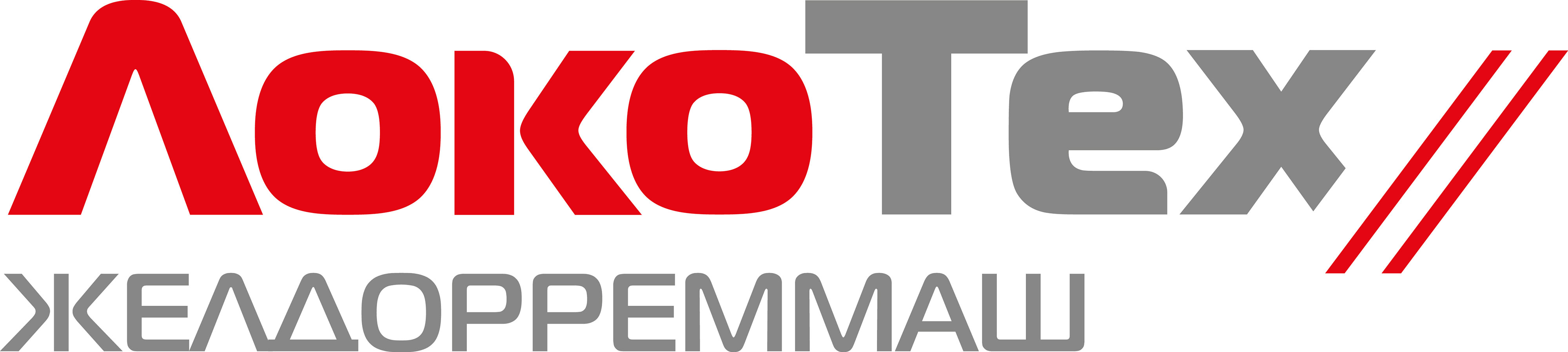
- Founded: 2009
- Headquarters: Moscow, Russia
- Parent: Locotech Group

Zheldorremmash (Russian: Желдорреммаш) is a locomotive repair and maintenance company. The company also manufactures and sells spare parts for locomotives. The company was created in 1999 and is located in Moscow, Russia.

The company has approximately 22,000 employees.

== History ==
In 2008, Russian Railways consolidated 10 locomotive repair plants that it owned and created a separate company called Zheldorremmash to run the repair plants. The plants are located in Yekaterinburg, Rostov-on-Don, Novosibirsk, Chelyabinsk, Yaroslavl, Astrakhan, Voronezh, Ulan-Ude, Orenburg, and Ussuriysk.

In 2011, the company repaired around 2,100 locomotives (900 diesel and 1,200 electric). In 2011, Zheldorremmash made 31.3 billion rubles in revenue, and its profit was around 170 million rubles.

== Ownership ==
Ownership as of December 2015:

- Russian Railways (25%)
- TMH-Service (75%)
