= Volumetric mesh =

Polygonal representation of the interior volume of an object

In 3D computer graphics and modeling, a volumetric mesh is a polyhedral representation of the interior region of an object. It is unlike polygon meshes, which represent only the surface as polygons.

== Applications ==
One application of volumetric meshes is in finite element analysis, which may use regular or irregular volumetric meshes to compute internal stresses and forces in an object throughout the entire volume of the object.

Volume meshes may also be used for portal rendering.

== See also ==
- B-rep
- Voxels
- Hypergraph
- Volume rendering
