= IRONCAD =

3D and 2D computer-aided-design software

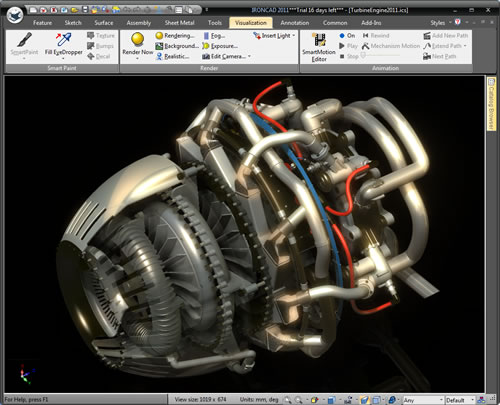
- IRONCAD user interface
- Original author: Visionary Design Systems (VDS)
- Developer: IronCAD LLC
- Release: 1998; 28 years ago
- Stable release: IRONCAD 2025
- Operating system: Windows
- Platform: Windows 11, Windows 10, Windows 8.1
- Type: CAD
- License: Proprietary
- Website: www.ironcad.com

IRONCAD is a software product for 3D and 2D CAD (computer-aided-design) design focused mainly on the mechanical design market that runs on Microsoft Windows. It is developed by Atlanta, GA based IronCAD LLC.

== History ==
IRONCAD was originally developed by Visionary Design Systems (VDS) based in Santa Clara, CA. The product launched in 1998. In 2001 the development team led by Dr. Tao-Yan Han split from VDS (now known as Alventive) to form IronCAD LLC to continue the development of the IRONCAD product.

IronCAD descended from a product called Trispectives, developed by 3D Eye, an Atlanta-based company that was acquired by VDS.

== Release history ==
Version	Release date
1.4	August 1998
2.0	May 1999
3.2	January 2000
4.0	December 2000
4.2	June 2001
5.0	October 2001
5.2	May 2002
6.0	February 2003
7.0	June 2004
8.0	June 2005
8.2	March 2006
9.0	June 2006
10.0	November 2007
11.0	December 2008
2009 (12.0)	November 2009
2011 (13.0)	November 2010
2012 (14.0)	September 2011
2013 (15.0)	November 2012
2014 (16.0)	November 2013
2015 (17.0)	November 2014
2016 (18.0)	November 2015
2017 (19.0)	November 2016
2018 (20.0)	December 2017
2019 (21.0)	December 2018
2020 (22.0)	November 2019
2021 (23.0)	December 2020
2022 (24.0)	December 2021
2023 (25.0)	December 2022
2024 (26.0)	December 2023
2025 (27.0)	December 2024
2026 (28.0)	October 2025
2027 (29.0)	June 2026

== Solid Modeling Methodology ==
IRONCAD's primary focus is on 3D CAD design using solid modeling technology. IRONCAD uses both Parasolid and ACIS modeling kernels to provide computational methods for solving geometric calculations such as calculating blends and shells. Users create designs in 3D using a drag and drop design methodology by dragging and dropping shapes and components from 3D catalogs to build parts and assemblies. They then use those designs to communicate with other users in the design process using both 3D models and 2D drawings. The drawings remain associative to the 3D model so as the model is updated the drawings reflect the changes. IRONCAD also employs the use of direct face editing and allows the combination of features and direct face edits within the same part.

To assist people in learning products many users have written books on IronCAD's products to assist customers in training of the software.
