= Shapr3D =

Computer-aided design software

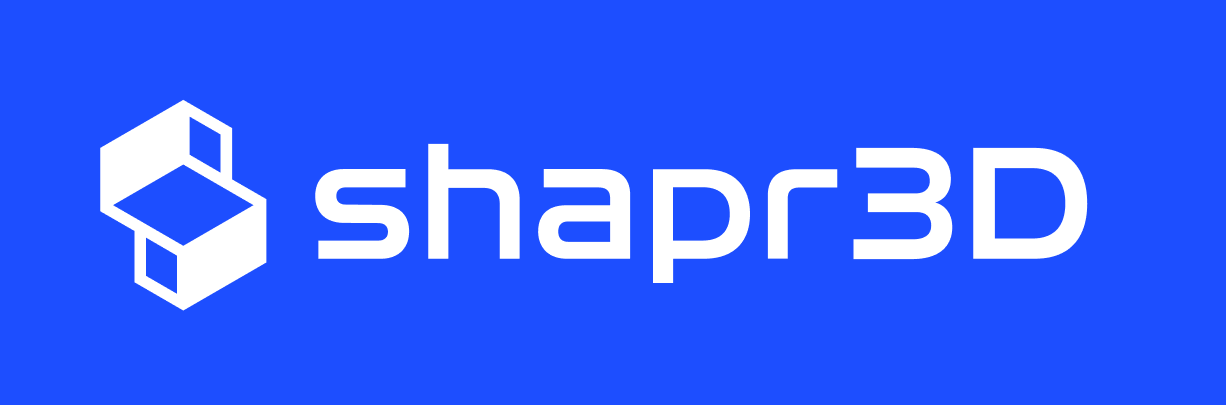

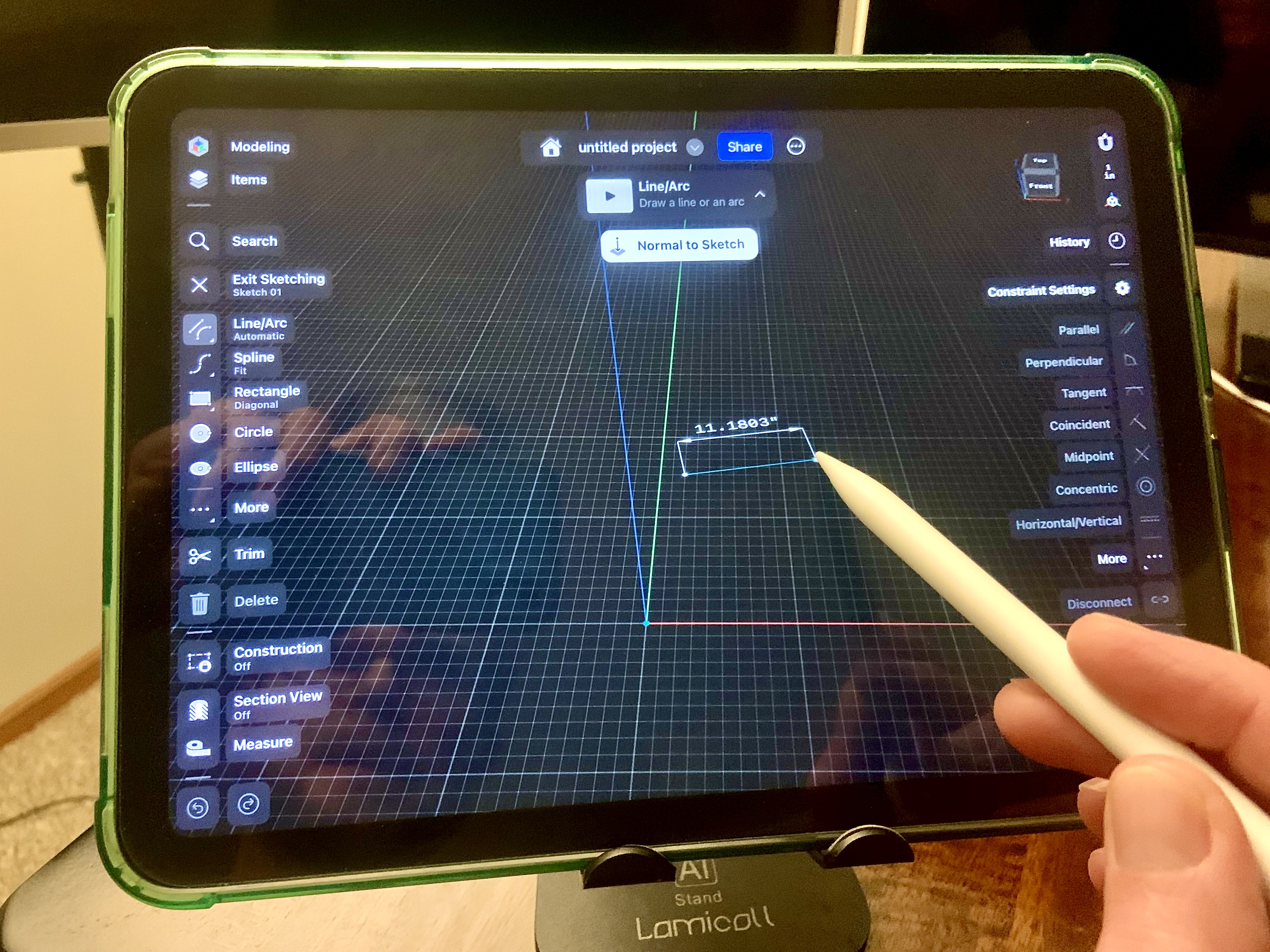
- Shapr3D on iPadOS
- Developer: Shapr3D Zrt
- Operating system: iPadOS, Windows, macOS, visionOS
- Type: CAD
- Website: shapr3d.com

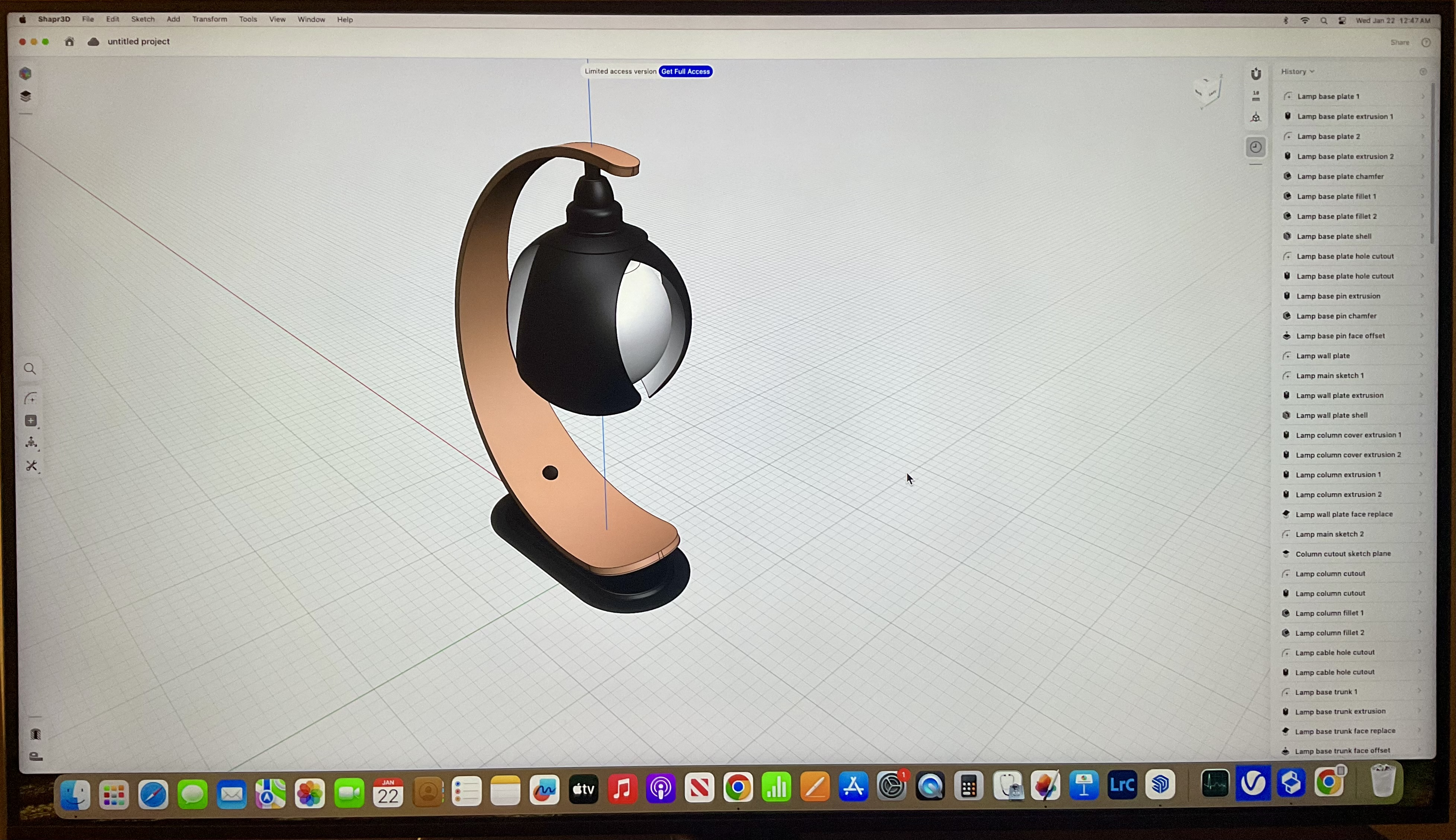
Shapr3D for MacOS

Shapr3D is 3D modeling software initially released for iPadOS to work with the Apple Pencil and multi-touch gesturing as a workflow. It has been ported to run on macOS and Windows.

== History ==
=== Founding and Early Development (2014-2016) ===
In 2014, Shapr3D was founded by István Csanády in Budapest, Hungary. He made a bet on Apple's (at the time rumored) iPad Pro, believing that Apple would reposition the iPad from a content consumption device to a content creation tool. This vision drove the founding of Shapr3D, combining his background in CAD with the emerging potential of professional tablet computing.

=== Product Launch (2016-2020) ===
2016: Shapr3D 1.0 launched exclusively on the iPad Pro in March, designed specifically for the Apple Pencil and featured in Apple advertisements. The initial product took three years to establish solid foundations, as building an industrial-grade CAD system proved extremely challenging.

2017: Shapr3D 3.0 marked a significant technical transition in December from the open-source Open Cascade Technology geometric modeling kernel to the industry-leading Parasolid geometry kernel, enhancing modeling precision and compatibility.

2020: Shapr3D won the Apple Design Awards, recognizing the software for innovation, ingenuity, and outstanding design in mobile application development.

2021: The company reached approximately 100 employees.

=== Platform Expansion and Brand Evolution (2021-2024) ===
2021: Shapr3D expanded to macOS in April, bringing more flexibility and processing power to users.

2022: Cross-device synchronization was introduced in September, enabling seamless work continuation across different machines.

2023: History-Based Parametric Modeling launched in September, moving from beta to full release. The year also marked significant brand and user interface refreshes, developed in collaboration with Berlin-based design studio Koto, reflecting the company's evolution and introducing the "Harness Complexity" philosophy.

2024: The product was released on Apple Vision Pro in March, becoming the only full-featured CAD tool available on the platform. In June, Teamspace was introduced for collaborative design sharing.

== Technical Specifications ==
Shapr3D has adopted the approach of creating accessible tools that enable anyone in a design organization to contribute to 3D modeling workflows.

=== Geometric Modeling Kernel ===
Shapr3D utilizes the Parasolid geometric modeling kernel, transitioning from Open Cascade in 2017. This provides high-precision geometric calculations, boolean operations, and compatibility dicated by industry (ISO) standards.

=== Platform Support ===
- iPadOS: Native application optimized for iPad Pro and Apple Pencil
- macOS: Full-featured desktop application (launched 2021)
- Windows: Desktop version
- visionOS: Initially available via Apple Vision Pro (launched 2024)
- Cloud Integration (PDM): Cross-platform synchronization (launched 2022)

== Release history ==
Version	Release Date	Major Features
26.150	August 17, 2026	Bug fixes and stability improvements
26.140	August 3, 2026	Bug fixes and stability improvements
26.120	July 7, 2026	Direct Prusa slicer export (EasyPrint/PrusaSlicer); Folders in dashboard search results
26.110	June 22, 2026	New Visualization materials (brick, MDF, oak flooring, Douglas fir); Decal placement now adds copies instead of replacing surface material; Construction planes and axes on imported STL meshes restored
26.100	June 8, 2026	Revolve tool boolean badge (join, subtract, intersect, new body); Cylindrical projection toggle for decals; Hidden edge visibility control in Wireframe and Section View
26.90	May 27, 2026	X-Ray mode in Display Modes with opacity slider; Decal face chaining across connected surfaces; Decals in PBR and USD exports; Construction tools moved to dedicated Construct menu; Improved construction plane and axis snapping
26.80	May 12, 2026	Decals in Visualization (import .png/.jpeg for logos and labels); Selection rendering always on top of geometry; Saved Views capture Section View on/off states
26.70	April 28, 2026	Wireframe mode silhouettes including Section View faces; AR vertical surface snapping (iPadOS)
26.60	April 21, 2026	.png/.jpeg images as custom materials in Visualization; Performance improvements for repetitive bodies and large assembly imports
26.50	March 30, 2026	Section Only mode in Section View; 2D view toggle with Normal to Section option; Wrap & Emboss gizmo for rotation and depth adjustment
26.40	March 17, 2026	Edge display in Visualized shader; New materials (painted ash, cork, oak, matte car paint); Loading screen tips and shortcuts; Release notes accessible from Dashboard
26.30	March 3, 2026	Wrap & Emboss tool for cylindrical and conical surfaces; Ortho View toggle in Section View; Section view settings preserved in Saved Views; Screenshot tool button in workspace; Advanced import preferences for STEP/IGES/CATIA/SolidWorks/Solid Edge (up to 70% faster); Refreshed Project tool icon
26.20	February 18, 2026	Screenshot resolution presets (actual size, double, Full HD, 4K/8K)
26.10	February 4, 2026	Custom material import via .glb files in Visualization; World-axis snapping constraints in sketching; Multi-project import from Import Projects dialog
26.0	January 21, 2026	Sweep Scale, Orientation, and Twist controls in History sidebar
5.1010	December 8, 2025	Direct Shapr3D project import into workspace; Expanded sketch snapping for construction plane intersections; Off-plane geometry snapping in orthogonal mode
5.1000	November 28, 2025	Dedicated Display Modes menu (Shaded, Visualized, Zebra, Curvature Map); Grid lines and world axis visibility toggle in Appearance menu; Wireframe shader option
5.990	November 10, 2025	Parasolid v38.0 import engine upgrade; Improved performance for Siemens NX, Solid Edge, and SolidWorks imports
5.980	October 29, 2025	Seamless mode switching in editor without returning to Project Sidebar; 3Dconnexion driver 10.8.10 integration (macOS)
5.970	October 17, 2025	Split Body tool supports multiple splitting tools; Direct project sharing without teams; Drafts refocused on early-stage work; Navigation Presets expanded (Alias, CATIA, NX)
5.960	October 1, 2025	Section View interference highlighting; AI-enhanced image capture in Visualization; In-app project access management; Review Links moved to Export dialog
5.950	September 16, 2025	Material search and adjustable environment lighting altitude in Visualization; Shaded and Visualized shader selection; Curvature Map for surface analysis
5.940	September 2, 2025	New materials and material identification features in Visualization
5.930	August 18, 2025	Major performance overhaul for sketching workflows with dramatic speed improvements, plus Dashboard enhancements
5.920	August 5, 2025	Project/Review Link sharing from Export modal; Offset Edge tool with constraints and variables; Chain type support; Smoother Design History scrolling
5.910	July 21, 2025	X, Y, Z deltas in Measure mode; Cloud storage for inactive projects; Images in Visualization; Dashboard editing info (Windows); Team member count display
5.900	July 9, 2025	Project link sharing from Share dialog; Dynamic member icons for spaces (iPadOS/macOS)
5.890	June 25, 2025	Dashboard shows team member count and last editor info; Browser project links; Direct project sharing from dashboard; Enhanced measurement with max distance and type icons
5.880	June 10, 2025	"Reveal in Items" command; Show/hide items commands; Camera rotation with fixed increments; Pattern tool variable support; Items Manager highlighting
5.870	May 28, 2025	Fixed increment camera rotation; Tessellation quality options; Dashboard renamed "Private" to "Drafts"; Review links management; AR performance improvements
5.860	May 13, 2025	Screenshot to clipboard; Mirror tool symmetry constraints; Dynamic Section View cut plane adjustment
5.850	April 29, 2025	Solar Panel material; Screenshot tool (Windows); Mirror tool symmetry constraints
5.840	April 14, 2025	Enhanced Section View colors; Improved tool previews; Expression functions (abs, min)
5.830	April 1, 2025	Customizable refractive materials (Transmission/IOR); Overlap selection popup; Select Through mode
5.820	March 18, 2025	Selected items visibility through overlapping bodies
5.810	March 5, 2025	Fully/under-defined sketches with constraints; Color-coded sketch states; Email-based Webviewer sharing
5.800	February 18, 2025	Variables with expressions for parametric modeling
5.790	February 4, 2025	Expressions for parametric relationships
5.770	December 11, 2024	Frosted glass and brass materials; Items Manager visibility control
5.760	November 19, 2024	Disable Visualization materials in web exports; iPad Items Manager tree view; Windows assembly import improvements
5.750	November 4, 2024	Faster project reloading; Camera/view reset on project re-entry
5.740	October 24, 2024	Construction Sketching toggle in sketch mode
5.730	October 8, 2024	Project Versions tracking; New Visualization environments; Camera animation toggle; Custom keyboard shortcuts
5.720	September 23, 2024	Save 8 orientation views; Extrude start/end offsets; Sketch constraint control
5.710	September 10, 2024	History step preservation; Import file names in History
5.700	August 27, 2024	Chordal fillets; World axes sketch constraints; USDZ material export fix
5.690	August 13, 2024	Roughness property in Visualization; Export format favorites; Batch export from Dashboard; Symmetric extrude
5.681	August 1, 2024	Batch export; Angle constraints between body edge and sketch
5.660	July 15, 2024	Teamspace collaboration; History error alerts; GLB export compression options
5.650	July 1, 2024	GLB and USDZ export; History reference management; Export UI improvements
5.640	June 17, 2024	Move/Rotate tool for mixed selections
5.630	June 4, 2024	Unlinked body copies; Improved Extrude sketch handling; Project tool fixes
5.620	May 21, 2024	Merge history steps; Project tool enhancements; Pattern tool improvements; Visualization material filters
5.600	April 22, 2024	Automotive materials (car paint, leather, textile, plastic)
5.590	April 15, 2024	History-Based Parametric Modeling out of beta; Advanced fillet controls; Projection parameters
5.580	March 25, 2024	Emissive materials; Construction geometry history steps; Loft editing
5.570	March 11, 2024	"Unrelated" label for history steps
5.560	February 27, 2024	.shapr format export from Dashboard
5.550	February 12, 2024	Custom-angled base views for 2D drawings; Bodies option for base views
5.540	January 29, 2024	Stability improvements and bug fixes
5.530	January 15, 2024	Stability improvements and bug fixes
5.520	December 6, 2023	Show/hide constraints and dimensions; Project sorting; Keyboard shortcuts (iPad/macOS)
5.510	November 20, 2023	Improved point selection workflow
5.500	November 6, 2023	Project renaming from modeling space (iPad/macOS); Memory consumption fixes
5.492	October 30, 2023	Folders for project organization; Sidebar navigation
5.490	October 17, 2023	Bug fixes
5.480	October 9, 2023	Drag views in 2D Drawings; Enhanced Section View visibility
5.470	September 25, 2023	Project renaming (Windows); Adjustable Items Manager; Menu layout consistency; Undo/Redo placement options
5.460	September 11, 2023	Menu bar (Windows); 2D Drawings base/projection views; Automatic view alignment; Isometric view selection
5.450	August 28, 2023	Wood materials and visual improvements; 2D Drawings dimension snapping; Grid size display
5.440	August 14, 2023	Project Sidebar; Refreshed UI with new icons and design; Modes section in main menu
5.430	July 31, 2023	History-Based Parametric Modeling beta signup; Bug fixes
5.420	July 24, 2023	2D Drawings dimension snapping; Drawing duplication; SLDASM file linking (iPad/macOS)
5.410	July 3, 2023	Easier XY-YZ-ZX base plane selection
5.400	June 19, 2023	Manual material orientation; Detail views from section views
5.390	June 5, 2023	Detail views in 2D Drawings; Line width settings; Fractional inch/feet input
5.380	May 22, 2023	2D Drawings property controls; Visualization performance improvements
5.370	May 8, 2023	Title block layout selection; 2D Drawings preferences in sidebar; Material orientation; SpaceMouse fixes
5.360	April 24, 2023	Material Orientation in Visualization
5.350	April 11, 2023	10 additional languages (Windows); Title block text editing
5.340	March 27, 2023	Images in 2D Drawings; New menu controls for mode switching
5.330	March 13, 2023	Faster editing for large models; Measurement highlighting
5.320	February 27, 2023	Point-to-point measurements; Pin all measurement types; Items Manager improvements (Windows)
5.310	February 14, 2023	Measurement Mode visual updates; Sketching enhancements; Context menu (Mac/Windows)
5.300	January 30, 2023	Context menu (Mac/Windows); Depth of field in Camera tab; Pinned measurement annotations
5.290	January 16, 2023	2D drawings sharing via Webviewer; Measurement pinning; Various fixes
5.280	December 12, 2022	Webviewer HTML embedding; Textile finish improvements; Color accuracy fixes
5.270	November 28, 2022	Solidworks assembly import (Windows); PDF import (Windows); Webviewer password protection
5.260	November 14, 2022	Size tolerances in 2D drawings; Dark Salon environment; Spline improvements; Calculator in dimensions
5.250	November 2, 2022	20+ new fabric/metal materials; Measure mode; Keyboard shortcuts display; Enhanced lighting
5.240	October 17, 2022	Hotkeys for tools; Dark mode adaptation (Windows); SpaceMouse button assignment (Windows)
5.230	October 7, 2022	Webviewer with AR support; Sketch geometry tap/drag; Annotation optimization; Quick dimension editing
5.220	September 26, 2022	Depth of field effect in Visualization
5.210	September 7, 2022	Shapr3D Sync full release; SpaceMouse support (Windows); .shapr file association (Windows)
5.200	August 22, 2022	Adaptive menu optimization; Sketch visibility improvements; USDZ with materials; Visualization on Windows
5.190	August 9, 2022	Construction sketch marking; Circular pattern layout; Calculation in dimensions; Export customization (Windows)
5.180	July 25, 2022	Non-uniform scaling options
5.170	July 12, 2022	Linear patterns for sketches; Ground plane options (iPad/macOS)
5.160	June 29, 2022	Pattern tool (linear for 3D bodies); Multi-body alignment; Text tool preview; Enhanced constraints
5.150	June 13, 2022	Multi-selectable constraints; Constraint highlighting; Visibility options
5.140	May 31, 2022	New materials (Silver, Titanium, etc.); Faster sketch snapping; Stability improvements (Windows)
5.130	May 17, 2022	5 new environments (iPad/macOS); Ground plane shadows (iPad/macOS); Enhanced lighting
5.120	May 3, 2022	Coincident constraints; SLDPRT import (Windows); Customizable lights (iPad/macOS)
5.110	April 20, 2022	CAD key bindings (Windows); Bug fixes
5.100	April 4, 2022	Isolate mode; Improved sketch performance; Responsive layout (Windows)
5.90	March 22, 2022	Bug fixes for sketching; Smoother 3D/2D transitions
5.80	March 7, 2022	Section view for construction planes/faces; Sketching bug fixes; Major visual addition (iOS/macOS)
5.70	February 23, 2022	Diameter annotations toggle; Toolbar improvements (Windows); 2D rotation for mouse/trackpad (Windows)
5.60	February 8, 2022	4-decimal precision for dimensions; Text tool custom font fixes; Clean 2D drawings view option
5.50	January 26, 2022	Sketching bug fixes; Improved dimension selection
5.40	January 12, 2022	Mirror tool fixes for connected arcs; G2 fillet improvements; Discover tab (Windows only)
5.30	December 15, 2021	Advanced circular fillet options; Surface continuity settings; Zebra stripes curvature analysis; Text tool; SVG export improvements; Learn tab (Windows only)
5.20	November 22, 2021	UX improvements; SpaceMouse fixes (Mac); Sweep tool fixes; Items manager performance
5.10	November 10, 2021	Onboarding tutorial improvements; Faster project loading; 2D Drawings fixes; Touchpad support (Windows only)
5.0	October 28, 2021	Unified release across all platforms; Dark mode; Single-click design opening (Windows); Sketch constraints fixes; Various crash fixes
0.32	October 21, 2021 (Windows)	Standalone installer availability
0.30	October 13, 2021 (Windows)	2D drawings centermarks and centerlines; Dark mode; Persistent sketch tools; Input visualization
4.12	October 13, 2021 (iOS/macOS)	Section views improvements; Tool dropping fixes; Keyboard shortcut fixes; Tutorial improvements
0.27	September 28, 2021 (Windows)	Haptic feedback; Split Body tool; 2D drawings geometries; Dimension hover editing; Area Selection improvements
4.11	September 28, 2021 (iOS/macOS)	Account linking; Split Body tool; Advanced Chamfer/Fillet; Persistent sketch tools; SpaceMouse camera views (Mac)
0.25	September 9, 2021 (Windows)	Section views for 2D drawings; SVG export; Guide points improvements; Various tool fixes
4.10	September 8, 2021 (iOS/macOS)	Section views for 2D drawings; Loft guided curves; Guide points improvements; Help menu revamp
0.24	August 23, 2021 (Windows)	Pen compatibility checkpoint; Tool instructions toggle; 2D drawings hotkeys; Various fixes
4.9	August 19, 2021 (iOS/macOS)	SVG and 3MF export; Simplified sketch item repositioning; Fit-point spline improvements; SpaceMouse navigation modes (Mac)
0.23	July 30, 2021 (Windows)	Early Access release; Core modeling functionality; 2D drawings; Pen support; Browser login
4.8	July 19, 2021 (iOS/macOS)	Centerline geometries for 2D drawings; Area Selection fixes; Construction axes highlighting; STL export formats (Mac)
4.7	July 5, 2021 (iOS/macOS)	Shapr3D Forums integration; Shell and Project tool fixes; SpaceMouse support (Mac); Menu bar tools (Mac)
4.6	June 17, 2021 (iOS/macOS)	Area Selection with Apple Pencil; Live chat removal; Body name/measurement display; Various tool improvements
4.5	June 1, 2021 (iOS/macOS)	Command search bar; Tool menu reorganization; 2D drawings sync improvements; Area Selection fixes
4.10	March 20, 2021 (iOS/macOS)	Tutorial videos for mouse/trackpad users; Cursor icons for sketching tools; Bottom view projection fix; IGES model selection fix
4.40	April 29, 2021 (iOS/macOS)	Drag selection/cross-selection; Redesigned Color tool; Custom precision for 2D drawings dimensions; DWG/DXF layer organization
4.1.4	April 17, 2021 (iOS/macOS)	STEP and IGES export fixes
4.1.3	April 6, 2021 (iOS/macOS)	Improved imported model processing
4.1.2	March 29, 2021 (iOS/macOS)	Standard subscription plan; Cursor icons for sketching tools; Bottom view projection fix; IGES model selection fix
4.10	March 20, 2021 (iOS/macOS)	Tutorial videos for mouse/trackpad users; Cursor icons for sketching tools; Bottom view projection fix; IGES model selection fix
4.00	March 8, 2021 (iOS/macOS)	macOS officially out of beta; 2D Drawings introduction; Technical drawings with base views; Dimensioning and annotation; DWG/DXF/PDF export; New subscription plans
3.60	February 24, 2021 (iOS/macOS)	Hover effects for images and mesh bodies; Various crash fixes
3.59	February 15, 2021 (iOS/macOS)	Enhanced hover effects with guide points; Optimized tutorial videos for mouse/trackpad users
3.58	February 1, 2021 (iOS/macOS)	Sketching improvements; Hover effects for hidden edges; Tutorial improvements; Canvas controls fixes
3.57	January 21, 2021 (iOS/macOS)	Hover highlighting for all geometry; 2D mode rotation arrows for mouse/trackpad; Bug fixes
3.56	December 7, 2020 (iOS/macOS)	First public beta for Shapr3D for macOS; Enhanced Align tool; Spline tool shortcut fix; Learn page updates
3.54	November 17, 2020 (iOS)	Keyboard and mouse/trackpad support; New tutorials and onboarding; Projection bug fixes
3.53	October 29, 2020 (iOS)	Augmented Reality (AR) support; USDZ export; Extrude tool crash fixes
3.52	October 15, 2020 (iOS)	Align tool; SLDASM import improvements; Sketch dimension cleanup; Extrude tool improvements
3.51	October 8, 2020 (iOS)	Chamfer/Fillet and Offset Face tool shortcuts; Various tool fixes; Color preservation in Subtract
3.50	September 29, 2020 (iOS)	STEP/X_T export hierarchy preservation; Construction geometry tutorial updates; Import bug fixes
3.49	September 4, 2020 (iOS)	SOLIDWORKS SLDPRT and SLDASM import; Replace Face tool badges; Adaptive UI improvements; Subtract tool options
3.48	August 24, 2020 (iOS)	SLDPRT import; Adaptive UI for sketching; Project tool badges; Boolean tools improvements; Items manager naming
3.47	August 11, 2020 (iOS)	Mirror tool badges; Adaptive UI improvements; Backend bug fixes
3.46	July 23, 2020 (iOS)	3D import progress display; Failed import details; Items manager naming improvements
3.45	July 13, 2020 (iOS)	Intersect and Subtract tool badges; Clearer tooltips; Updated Union tool workflow
3.44	June 26, 2020 (iOS)	Tool tips and tricks; Offset Edge tool improvements for multiple edges
3.43	June 15, 2020 (iOS)	STEP import structure preservation; Bug fixes; Compressed tutorial content
3.42	June 9, 2020 (iOS)	Adaptive modeling menu (20% speed increase); Redesigned Items manager; Simplified export; Third-angle projection
3.41	June 2, 2020 (iOS)	Improved Guides feature; Sketch/edge projection on construction planes; Enhanced Line/Arc tool; Axes availability
3.40	May 14, 2020 (iOS)	Error-free Parasolid imports; Items manager improvements; Modeling tool refinements; 13 bug fixes
3.39	May 3, 2020 (iOS)	Color preservation in imports; Clear sketch labels; Performance improvements for large designs; 25 bug fixes
3.38	April 20, 2020 (iOS)	Image import fixes; Items improvements; Modeling tool fixes; Updated video tooltips; 35 bug fixes
3.37	April 7, 2020 (iOS)	Ground preparation for major release; Bug fixes; Updated video tooltips
3.36	March 5, 2020 (iOS)	Line/Arc drawing settings; Delete folder improvements; Section view fixes
3.35	February 25, 2020 (iOS)	Reconfigured Revolve tool; Menu freeze fixes; Arc-related fixes
3.34	February 18, 2020 (iOS)	Group items with folders; Revamped Shell tool; Revamped Rotate around axis tool
3.33	February 7, 2020 (iOS)	Revamped Extrude tool with arrows; Projection fixes for non-planar surfaces
3.32	February 5, 2020 (iOS)	Select hidden edges; Drag and drop multiple items; Items usability improvements
3.31	January 22, 2020 (iOS)	Orientation cube shortcut; Dedicated Spline tool; Items usability improvements
3.30	December 13, 2019 (iOS)	Interactive Orientation Cube; Units and Appearances menu; Disconnect button improvements
3.29	December 6, 2019 (iOS)	Intuitive sketch guides; Spline task removal from onboarding
3.28	November 28, 2019 (iOS)	Polygons as unified geometry; Apple Pencil pressure sensitivity; Interface configuration
3.27	November 21, 2019 (iOS)	
3.26	November 8, 2019 (iOS)	
3.25	October 31, 2019 (iOS)	
3.24	October 17, 2019 (iOS)	
3.23	September 27, 2019 (iOS)	
3.22	September 15, 2019 (iOS)	
3.21	September 8, 2019 (iOS)	
3.20	August 21, 2019 (iOS)	
3.19	July 30, 2019 (iOS)	
3.18	July 16, 2019 (iOS)	Brand new export/import menu; Format annotations; Sketching and constraints improvements; Export annotation fixes
3.17	July 8, 2019 (iOS)	DWG/DXF import/export; Auto-constraints option; Post-onboarding tutorial improvements
3.16	June 17, 2019 (iOS)	Sketching improvements and bug fixes
3.15	June 6, 2019 (iOS)	Boolean operations with solid MESH; Subtract, intersection, and union with mesh geometry
3.14	May 30, 2019 (iOS)	STL import (PRO feature); Folders system; Multi-layer file structure; Smarter export/import
3.13	May 16, 2019 (iOS)	Free version limited to 2 designs; Import becomes PRO feature; Coordinate axes for Revolve; Educational license flow
3.12	May 10, 2019 (iOS)	Items in Screenshot tool; Move multiple bodies to folder; Dubbed extended tutorials; New video player
3.11	April 11, 2019 (iOS)	Help Menu; Gestures guide; Post-onboarding videos; Items improvements; Updated tool videos
3.9	March 20, 2019 (iOS)	Arrow interactions; Items (Folders) system; Body renaming; Orthographic 3D view; Tool help videos
3.8.2	February 26, 2019 (iOS)	Polygon 2D shapes; Spline point editing; Transform tool improvements
3.8.1	February 14, 2019 (iOS)	Improved 2-finger/3-finger tap undo/redo
3.8	February 11, 2019 (iOS)	3-point rectangles; Reimagined sketching; 2D primitives; Interpolated splines; Smarter arc with angles
3.7	February 1, 2019 (iOS)	Reimagined sketching; 2D primitives; Interpolated splines; Smarter arc with angles; Section view improvements
3.6.3	January 11, 2019 (iOS)	Loft, Construction Geometry, and Translate control point fixes
3.6	December 17, 2018 (iOS)	7 new languages; Segmented onboarding; Performance improvements; Various bug fixes
3.5.6	December 6, 2018 (iOS)	Delete spline points; Image alignment; Translate and Offset bug fixes
3.5.4	November 19, 2018 (iOS)	Project tool; Grid lock; Language selector; Hide edges in screenshots; Sketching improvements
3.5.3	October 31, 2018 (iOS)	Reimagined Loft tool; Subtract improvements; Reduced app size; OBJ export (PRO); Last update for iOS 10
3.5	September 26, 2018 (iOS)	
3.4	August 23, 2018 (iOS)	
3.3	July 3, 2018 (iOS)	
3.2	May 19, 2018 (iOS)	
3.0	December 8, 2017 (iOS)	Introduction of the Parasolid Kernel
2.2	March 21, 2017 (iOS)	
2.1	March 1, 2017 (iOS)	
2.0	December 9, 2016 (iOS)	
1.2	June 13, 2016 (iOS)	
1.0	March 22, 2016 (iOS)	Shapr3D initial release

== See also ==
- List of 3D modeling software
- Comparison of computer-aided design software
