= Parasolid =

Geometric modeling kernel

- Developers: Shape Data Ltd, Siemens Digital Industries Software
- Release: 1986; 40 years ago
- Stable release: v39.0 / 31 July 2026; 25 days ago
- Operating system: Windows, Linux, macOS, iOS, Android
- Platform: IA-32, x86-64, Apple silicon, AArch64.
- Available in: English
- Type: geometric modeling kernel
- License: proprietary
- Website: plm.sw.siemens.com/en-US/plm-components/parasolid

Parasolid is a geometric modeling kernel originally developed by Shape Data Limited, now owned and developed by Siemens Digital Industries Software. It can be licensed by other companies for use in their 3D computer graphics software products.

Parasolid's abilities include model creation and editing utilities such as Boolean modeling operators, feature modeling support, advanced surfacing, thickening and hollowing, blending and filleting, and sheet modeling. It also incorporates modeling with mesh surfaces and lattices. Parasolid also includes tools for direct model editing, including tapering, offsetting, geometry replacement and removing feature details with automated regeneration of surrounding data. Parasolid also provides wide-ranging graphical and rendering support, including hidden-line, wireframe and drafting, tessellation, and model data inquiries.

To use Parasolid effectively, software developers need knowledge of CAD in general, computational geometry, and topology.

Parasolid is available for Windows (32-bit, 64-bit and AArch64), Linux (64-bit and AArch64), macOS (Apple silicon and Intel), iOS, including Catalyst, and Android.

== Parasolid XT format ==
Parasolid XT
- Filename extension: .X_T,.X_B,.P_T and .P_B
- Developed by: Siemens Digital Industries Software
- Type of format: textual, binary

Parasolid parts are normally saved in XT format, which usually has the file extension .X_T. The format is documented and open. There is also a binary version of the format, usually with an .X_B extension, which is somewhat more compact. Both .X_T and .X_B are used for parts files.

== Applications ==
It is used in many computer-aided design (CAD), computer-aided manufacturing (CAM), computer-aided engineering (CAE), product visualization, and CAD data exchange packages.

Notable uses include:

- Abaqus
- ADINA
- Alibre Design
- Altair HyperWorks
- Ansys
- Cimatron E
- COMSOL Multiphysics
- Delcam
- Femap
- HyperMesh
- IRONCAD
- Mastercam
- MEDUSA4
- MicroStation
- Moldflow
- Onshape
- Plasticity
- PowerSHAPE
- Qinetiq Paramarine
- Quicksurface
- Shapr3D
- Siemens NX
- Simcenter STAR-CCM+
- SimScale
- Solid Edge
- SolidWorks
- T-FLEX CAD
- TopSolid
- Vectorworks
- WorkXPlore 3D
