= List of CAx companies =

This is a list of notable computer-aided technologies (CAx) companies, for which Wikipedia articles exist, and their software products. Software that supports CAx technologies has been produced since the 1970s, for a variety of computer platforms. CAx applications incliude computer-aided design (CAD), computer-aided engineering (CAE), and computer-aided manufacturing (CAM). In addition, industrial-range CAx applications are supported by dedicated product data management (PDM), enterprise resource planning (ERP), and other software layers. General-purpose PDM and ERP software is not listed here.

== CAx software companies ==
Companies currently in existence and their products
Company name	Annual revenue (US$)	Product name	Product CAx type	Additional comments	Countries
4M		IDEA Architectural	CAD	Vertical CAD Application for 3D BIM Architectural Design	Greece
4M		FINE MEP	CAD	Vertical CAD Application for 3D BIM Mechanical Design, Electrical Design & Plumbing Design	Greece
Altinex Inc.		AVSnap	CAD	Audio visual system design, GUI design, Control Logic design, terminal emulation, Remote support platform	
Ansys Inc.		SpaceClaim	CAD		
ASCON		KOMPAS-3D	CAD		
ASCON		KOMPAS Builder	CAD		
ASCON		KOMPAS Graphite	CAD		
Ashlar-Vellum		Argon			
Ashlar-Vellum		Cobalt			
Ashlar-Vellum		Graphite			
Ashlar-Vellum		Xenon			
Autodesk	$2,172M	AutoCAD and Architectural Desktop	CAD		
Autodesk	$2,172M	Mechanical Desktop	CAD		
Autodesk	$2,172M	Autodesk Inventor	CAD		
Autodesk	$2,172M	Fusion 360	CAD		
Autodesk	$2,172M	3ds Max			
Autodesk	$2,172M	Autodesk VIZ			
Autodesk	$2,172M	Revit		Originally of Revit Technology Corporation	
Autodesk	$2,172M	Alias StudioTools	CAID	Originally by Alias Systems Corporation	
Autodesk	$2,172M	Simulation CFD	CAE	Originally by Blue Ridge Numerics –CFdesign – Upfront CFD	
Autodesk	$2,172M	Tinkercad	CAD		
Autodesk	$2,172M	DUCT		Originally of Delcam	
Autodesk	$2,172M	PowerMILL	CAM	Originally of Delcam	
Autodesk	$2,172M	PowerSHAPE	CAD	Originally of Delcam	
Autodesk	$2,172M	FeatureCAM	CAM	Originally of Delcam	
Autodesk	$2,172M	CopyCAD		Originally of Delcam	
Autodesk	$2,172M	PowerINSPECT		Originally of Delcam	
Autodesk	$2,172M	ArtCAM		Originally of Delcam	
Bentley Systems		MicroStation	CAD		
Bentley Systems		Powerdraft			
Bricsys		BricsCAD	CAD	CAD software and development platform unifying the familiar feature set of native dwg with 2D tools and 3D direct modeling on Windows, MAC and Linux	
CadSoft Computer		EAGLE	EDA/ECAD/CAM	Multi-platform electronics schematic designer and PCB layout editor.	
CADSoftTools		ABViewer	CAD	Software for work with 2D and 3D CAD drawings.	
CADSoftTools		CST CAD Navigator	CAD	Cross platform CAD viewer (2D and 3D).	
Cadwork informatik AG		cadwork Lexocad	BIM	6D BIM with VDC features and IFC compliance for woods, roads, rail, structures, and commercial buildings.	
Celeritive		VoluMill	CAM	High-speed machining toolpath engine that runs embedded in other systems or as a standalone	
Cimatron		CimatronE	CAD/CAM	Integrated CAD/CAM for mold and die makers and manufacturers of discrete parts, providing associativity across the manufacturing process. Applications include: mold design, electrode design, die design, 2.5 to 5-axis NC programming, and 5-axis discrete part production.	Israel
CNC Software/Mastercam		Mastercam	CAD/CAM	Mastercam delivers CAD/CAM software tools for all types of programming, from the most basic to the extremely complex. 2-axis machining, multiaxis milling and turning, wire EDM, router applications, free-form artistic modeling and cutting, 3D design, drafting, surface and solid modeling.	
Collier Research Corporation		HyperSizer	CAE	Composite materials structural design	
Manycore Tech		Coohom	CAD	Interior design and high-quality rendering	
Dassault Systèmes	$1,100M	CATIA	CAD/CAE/CAM		France
Dassault Systèmes	$1,100M	Cosmos/M	CAE	Originally of SRAC	France
Dassault Systèmes	$1,100M	DesignStar	CAE	Originally of SRAC	France
Dassault Systèmes	$1,100M	Draftsight	CAD		France
Dassault Systèmes	$1,100M	CosmosWorks	CAE	Originally of SRAC	France
Dassault Systèmes	$1,100M	SolidWorks	CAD	Originally of SolidWorks Corporation	France
Dassault Systèmes	$1,100M	ACIS 3D Modeler	Kernel	Originally of Spatial Corp.	France
Dassault Systèmes	$1,100M	Euclid-IS	CAD	Originally of Matra DataVision	France
Dassault Systèmes	$1,100M	STRIM	CAD	Originally of Matra DataVision	France
Dassault Systèmes	$1,100M	ENOVIA SmarTeam	PDM	Originally of Smart Solutions	France
Dassault Systèmes	$1,100M	ENOVIA	PDM		France
Dassault Systèmes	$1,100M	MatrixOne	PDM		France
Dassault Systèmes	$1,100M	DELMIA	MPM	Originally of Deneb Robotics Inc.	France
Dassault Systèmes	$1,100M	ABAQUS	CAE	Originally of HKS, Inc.	France
DInsight		Digital Geometric Kernel	CAD	Development Framework for CAD/CAM-enabled applications. Geometric algorithms	
Dlubal Software		RFEM	CAD / CAE / FEM	Modeling, structural analysis, engineering and design of models with member, plate, wall, folded plate, shell, and solid elements	
Dlubal Software		RSTAB	CAD / CAE	Modeling, structural analysis, engineering and design of beam, frame or truss structures	
Donya Labs		Simplygon	CAD	Remeshing processing CAD into real-time renderable mesh	
Engineered Software		PowerCADD	CAD		
Eremex		TopoR	E-CAD		
Eremex		SimOne	E-CAD		
Eremex		Delta Design	E-CAD		
Exa Corp.		PowerFLOW	CAE	Computational fluid dynamics	
EXAPT		EXAPT	CAD / CAM	CAD/CAM-System and production data und tool management Software	
Trimble		SketchUp	CAD	Designed to be easier to use than other 3D CAD programs	
GrabCAD		GrabCAD	CAD	Free online CAD models library and engineering community.	
GRAITEC		GRAITEC Advance (Advance Steel, Advance Concrete, Advance Design)	CAD / CAE	Analysis and design for the construction engineering, steel and concrete modeling and detailing	
Graphisoft		ArchiCAD			
Graphisoft		Graphisoft Constructor			
Graphisoft		Graphisoft Estimator			
Graphisoft		Graphisoft Change Manager			
GStarsoft		GstarCAD	CAD	platform CAD software and applications	
Ing.-Buero FRIEDRICH (IBF)		TARGET 3001!	CAD	PCB Layout CAD Software including MID design, Front Panel design	
IMSI/Design Note: whilst IMSI design continues to market, according to their Facebook page they do not appear to be providing customer support nor have they actively posted since 2019.		TurboCAD Professional	CAD	Parametric CAD, solid modeling, dimensional constraints and photo-realistic rendering available in Standard, Architectural, Mechanical and Platinum Editions	
IMSI/Design Note: whilst IMSI design continues to market, according to their Facebook page they do not appear to be providing customer support nor have they actively posted since 2019.		TurboCAD Deluxe 2D/3D	CAD	Value-priced 2D and 3D CAD, surface modeling and realistic rendering for both Windows and Mac	
IMSI/Design Note: whilst IMSI design continues to market, according to their Facebook page they do not appear to be providing customer support nor have they actively posted since 2019.		TurboCAD Designer 2D	CAD	Value-priced 2D CAD for Windows and Mac	
IMSI/Design Note: whilst IMSI design continues to market, according to their Facebook page they do not appear to be providing customer support nor have they actively posted since 2019.		DesignCAD 3D Max	CAD	Entry-level 2D and 3D CAD, surface modeling and rendering	
IMSI/Design Note: whilst IMSI design continues to market, according to their Facebook page they do not appear to be providing customer support nor have they actively posted since 2019.		DesignCAD Express	CAD	Entry level 2D CAD	
Intergraph		GeoMedia			United States
Intergraph		IGDS			United States
Intergraph		Intergraph			United States
Intergraph		InterAct			United States
Intergraph		Smart3D	CAD		United States
Intergraph		SmartSketch			United States
Intergraph		CADWorx Plant	CAD	AutoCAD-based plant design.	United States
Intergraph		CADWorx P&ID	CAD	AutoCAD-based piping and instrumentation (P&ID) plant solution.	United States
Intergraph		CADWorx fieldPipe	CAD	Delivers plant as-built and spool verification in the field and on point cloud data.	United States
Intergraph		CADWorx E&I	CAD/CAE	Data-centric and product for design, engineering and the production of deliverables and reports for both electrical and instrumentation.	United States
Intergraph		CAESAR II	CAE	Evaluates the structural responses and stresses of piping systems to international codes and standards.	United States
Intergraph		PV Elite	CAE	Vessel and heat exchanger design, analysis and evaluation.	United States
Intergraph		TANK	CAE	Design, analysis and evaluation of oil storage tanks.	United States
IronCAD LLC		IRONCAD	CAD	3D solid modeling design tool with both direct geometric editing and history-based design and 2D drawing creation	United States
IronCAD LLC		INOVATE	CAD	3D conceptual product design tool	United States
IronCAD LLC		IRONCAD DRAFT	CAD	2D mechanical drafting and 3D file viewing	United States
IronCAD LLC		COMPOSE	CAD	3D file viewer and configuration design tool	United States
ISD Software und Systeme GmbH		HiCAD	CAD		
ISD Software und Systeme GmbH		HELiOS	PDM		
ITB Paul Schneider		ASi-Profile	CAD	Inventor add-on for mechanical engineering, constructional steelworking, plant construction	
Kubotek Corporation		KeyCreator	CAD	3D Direct CAD	
Kubotek Corporation		Machinist	CAM	NC utilities integrated within KeyCreator	
Kubotek Corporation		Validation Tool		3D model-to-model validation	
Kubotek Corporation		Spectrum		3D CAD Viewer	
Lattice Semiconductor		ispLever	CAD	FPGA design	
Lectra		Modaris	CAD	Textile and Soft Goods Industry (Apparel, Leather, Automotive, Marine, Aerospace, Technical Textiles)	France
Lectra		Kaledo	CAD		France
Lectra		Diamino	CAD		France
Lectra		DesignConcept	CAD		France
Lectra		Fashion PLM	PDM		France
Lectra		Vector	CAM		France
Lectra		GraphicPilot	CAM		France
McNeel		Rhinoceros 3D	CAD	NURBS-based modelling software	
Motor Design LTD		Motor-CAD	CAD	Thermal analysis of motors	
MSC Software	$300M	MSC Nastran	CAE		
MSC Software	$300M	MSC Patran	CAE		
MSC Software	$300M	ADAMS	CAE		
NC Graphics		Toolmaker			
NC Graphics		machining STRATEGIST		Until June 2002	
NC Graphics		Depocam			
NEi Software		NEi Nastran	CAE	Finite Element Analysis tool	United States
NEi Software		NEi Works	CAE	NEi Nastran embedded within SolidWorks	United States
NEi Software		NEi Fusion	CAE	combines parasolid geometry engine with NEi Nastran solvers	United States
NEi Software		NEi Explicit	CAE	parallel explicit solver integrated within NEi Nastran	United States
NEi Software		NEi Fluid Dynamics	CAE	advanced fluid dynamics analysis add-on for Femap	United States
NEi Software		NEi Thermal Basic	CAE	add-on module for linear and nonlinear, steady-state and transient heat transfer processes	United States
NEi Software		NEi Thermal Advanced	CAE	add-on module for advanced heat transfer capabilities in addition to those found in NEi Thermal Basic	United States
NEi Software		NEi Fatigue	CAE	dynamic loading conditions add-on for Femap	United States
NEi Software		NEi Aeroelasticity	CAE	advanced aeroelastic design and analysis	United States
NEi Software		NEi Optimization	CAE	design optimization through a GUI along with gradient-based and response surface optimization algorithms	United States
NEi Software		NEi Motion	CAE	virtual testing and verification of mechanical systems	United States
Nemetschek		Allplan BIM	CAD		
Nemetschek		Vectorworks	CAD	Formerly MiniCAD	
Open CASCADE SAS		Open CASCADE	Kernel	Originally of Matra DataVision	
Open CASCADE SAS		SALOME	CAD/CAE	Generic platform for Pre and Post-Processing for numerical simulation	
PTC	$1,300M	CREO (was Pro/Engineer)	CAD		United States
PTC	$1,300M	CADDS 5i	CAD	Originally of Computervision	United States
PTC	$1,300M	Pro/DESKTOP	CAD	Originally Designwave of Computervision	United States
PTC	$1,300M	Creo Simulate (was Pro/MECHANICA)	CAE	From Rasna acquisition	United States
PTC	$1,300M	Pro/Concept	CAID	Originally called 3D Paint	United States
PTC	$1,300M	Pro/Designer	CAID	Originally called CDRS	United States
PTC	$1,300M	Windchill	PDM		United States
PTC	$1,300M	Granite	Kernel		United States
PTC	$1,300M	CREO View	Visualization	From Division acquisition	United States
PTC	$1,300M	CoCreate OneSpace Modeling 2007	CAD	Originally called SolidDesigner (and prior to that, ME30)	United States
PTC	$1,300M	CoCreate Modeling Personal Edition 2.0	CAD	Free Explicit Modeling Software	United States
PTC	$1,300M	CoCreate OneSpace Drafting 2007	CAD	2D Drafting, originally called ME10	United States
PTC	$1,300M	CoCreate OneSpace.net	CPD	For Internet-based collaboration	United States
PTC	$1,300M	CoCreate Model Manager 2007	PDM	Originally called WorkManager	United States
Red Cedar Technology		HEEDS	CAE	Design optimization and process automation software.	
Sescoi		WorkXPlore 3D	CAD Viewer	Viewer for analyzing and sharing 2D and 3D CAD files without having to rely on the original CAD application.	
Siemens Digital Industries Software (Formerly UGS Corp, Unigraphics Solutions)	$1,100M	NX	CAD/CAID/CAE/CAM		United States
Siemens Digital Industries Software (Formerly UGS Corp, Unigraphics Solutions)	$1,100M	NX Nastran	CAE		United States
Siemens Digital Industries Software (Formerly UGS Corp, Unigraphics Solutions)	$1,100M	Solid Edge	CAD		United States
Siemens Digital Industries Software (Formerly UGS Corp, Unigraphics Solutions)	$1,100M	Parasolid	Kernel		United States
Siemens Digital Industries Software (Formerly UGS Corp, Unigraphics Solutions)	$1,100M	Femap	CAE		United States
Siemens Digital Industries Software (Formerly UGS Corp, Unigraphics Solutions)	$1,100M	EMS	CAD	Originally of Intergraph	United States
Siemens Digital Industries Software (Formerly UGS Corp, Unigraphics Solutions)	$1,100M	BRAVO	CAD	Originally of Applicon	United States
Siemens Digital Industries Software (Formerly UGS Corp, Unigraphics Solutions)	$1,100M	I-DEAS	CAD	Originally of SDRC	United States
Siemens Digital Industries Software (Formerly UGS Corp, Unigraphics Solutions)	$1,100M	NX I-deas	CAD	Transition product from I-DEAS to NX	United States
Siemens Digital Industries Software (Formerly UGS Corp, Unigraphics Solutions)	$1,100M	Simcenter STAR-CCM+	CAE		United States
Siemens Digital Industries Software (Formerly UGS Corp, Unigraphics Solutions)	$1,100M	Teamcenter	PDM		United States
Siemens Digital Industries Software (Formerly UGS Corp, Unigraphics Solutions)	$1,100M	Tecnomatix	MPM		United States
solidThinking		Evolve	CAE	Conceptual design tool for Mac or PC, originally named solidThinking	
solidThinking		Inspire	CAE	Structural concept generation tool	
SolutionWare Corporation		GeoPath	CAD/CAM	CNC programming for 2.5-axis milling, turning, 3-D Milling, wire-EDM, auto programming, solid verification, Mazatrol, fabrication, and solids	
SolutionWare Corporation		MazaCAM	CAM	CNC programming for milling, and turning for a wide range of Mazak machines	
SolutionWare Corporation		PowerCAM	CAM	CNC programming with direct Mazatrol and/or G-code output from within the SolidWorks interface	
Stardraw		Audio	CAD	CAD design for audio equipment and racks plus cable and equipment planning	
Stardraw		A/V	CAD	CAD design for audio/visual equipment and racks plus cable and equipment planning	
Stardraw		Lighting 2D	CAD	CAD design for theatrical lighting design	
Sprut Technology		SprutCAM	CAM	CNC programming for 2.5D, 3D, 4/5D axes indexed/simultaneous milling, HSM, FBM, multi-axis lathe, Turning, Mill-Turn, Wire EDM and robots	
Top Systems		T-FLEX CAD	CAD	2D and 3D Parametric CAD software	
Top Systems		T-FLEX CAM	CAM	Integrated CAM software	
Top Systems		T-FLEX DOCs	PDM		
Transoft Solutions Inc.		AutoTURN	CAD	AutoCAD / MicroStation add-on for vehicle swept path simulation	
VariCAD s. r. o.		VariCAD	CAD	CAD software for mechanical engineering	
Vectorworks, Inc.		Vectorworks Fundamentals	CAD	2D & 3D CAD software	United States
Vectorworks, Inc.		Vectorworks Architect		BIM software for Architecture	United States
Vectorworks, Inc.		Vectorworks Landmark		BIM software for Landscapes	United States
Vectorworks, Inc.		Vectorworks Spotlight		Scenic, Stage, and Lighting design software for live performance events	United States
Vectorworks, Inc.		ConnectCAD	CAD	AV schematics software add-on module for Vectorworks Spotlight	United States
Vectorworks, Inc.		Braceworks	CAD	Structural Analysis for temporary events. Add on module for Vectorworks Spotlight	United States
Vectorworks, Inc.		Vision		Previzualization and lighting control software for live events	United States
Zuken		CR-5000	CAD	Electronic CAD software	
Zuken		CR-8000	CAD	Electronic CAD software	
Zuken		Cadstar	CAD	Electronic CAD software	
Zuken		E3.series	E-CAD	Electrical and fluid engineering software	
Zuken		eCadstar	CAD	Electronic CAD software	
ZWSOFT		ZWCAD	CAD	A DWG-based CAD platform designed for professional 2D drafting and documentation.	
ZWSOFT		ZW3D	CAD/CAM	A 3D CAD/CAM software developed for the machinery and manufacturing industries.	

== Past CAD Brands ==
Acquired, orphaned, failed or rebranded.

Alias
Acquired by Autodesk
Applicon
Acquired by UGS Corporation
CADAM
Acquired by Dassault Systèmes
CADCentre
Rebranded as Aveva
Baystate Technologies
Acquired by Kubotek Corporation
BARCO NV
Now called Ucamco for printed circuit board applications
Camsco
Acquired by Gerber
CIS (Cambridge Interactive Systems)
Acquired by Computervision
CADKEY
Acquired by Baystate Technologies
Calma
Acquired by Computervision
Claris
Published "ClarisCAD", abandoned in transition of company to FileMaker
Computervision
Acquired by Parametric Technology Corporation
Diehl Graphsoft
Acquired by Nemetschek
Investronica
Acquired by Lectra
Matra DataVision
Acquired by Dassault Systèmes
Microdynamics
Acquired by Gerber
Micro Engineering Solutions
Published "Solution 3000" and "ADX", acquired by Autodesk
NC Graphics
Acquired by Parametric Technology Corporation
Revit Technology Corporation
Acquired by Autodesk
Shape Data
Acquired by Siemens
Spatial Corp.
Acquired by Dassault Systèmes
SDRC
Acquired by UGS Corporation
SRAC
(Structural Research and Analysis Corporation) acquired by SolidWorks Corporation
SolidWorks Corporation
Acquired by Dassault Systèmes
SDRC-IDEAS
Acquired by Unigraphics Solutions
Unigraphics Solutions a.k.a. UGS Corporation
Acquired by Siemens

== Open source CAD software projects ==
=== 2D ===
- RibbonSoft QCAD
- Archimedes – Architectural CAD program.
- LibreCAD Open source 2D CAD Program.

=== 3D ===
- Blender is a free and open-source 3D computer graphics software toolset for creating animated films, visual effects, art, 3D printed models, interactive 3D applications and video games.
- BRL-CAD
- FreeCAD – an open source CAD/CAE, based on Open CASCADE, Qt and Python.
- OpenSCAD
- Open Cascade Technology (OCCT, formerly known as CAS.CADE) – an SDK from Open Cascade for 3D CAD, CAM, and CAE.

== See also ==
- Comparison of CAD software
- CAD data exchange
- CAD/CAM in the footwear industry
- List of 3D modeling software
- List of BIM software
- List of computer-aided engineering software
- List of computer-aided manufacturing software
