= Navisworks =

Autodesk design review package

- Developer(s): Autodesk
- Stable release: 22.4 / 2025
- Operating system: Windows
- Type: 3D computer graphics
- License: Proprietary
- Website: autodesk.com/products/navisworks

Navisworks (previously known as JetStream) is a 3D design review package for Microsoft Windows.

Used primarily in the architecture, engineering, and construction (AEC) industries to complement 3D design packages (such as Autodesk Revit, AutoCAD, and MicroStation), Navisworks allows users to open and combine 3D models; navigate around them in real-time (without the WASD possibility); and review the model using a set of tools including comments, redlining, viewpoint, and measurements. A selection of plug-ins enhances the package adding interference detection, 4D time simulation, photorealistic rendering and PDF-like publishing.

The software was originally created by Sheffield, UK based developer NavisWorks (a subsidiary of Lightwork Design). NavisWorks was purchased by Autodesk for $25 million on June 1, 2007.

== Components ==
Navisworks (formerly JetStream) is built around a core module called Roamer and has a number of built-in functionalities:

- Roamer - The core part allows users to open models from a range of 3D design and laser scan formats and combine them into a single 3D model. Users can then navigate around the model in real-time and review the model with a range of mark-up tools.
- Publisher - This allows users to publish the complete 3D model into a single NWD file that can be freely opened by anyone using Freedom, a free viewer.
- Clash Detective - A functionality to enable interference detection. This means users can select parts of the model and look for places where the geometry conflicts. This is for finding faults in the design.
- Renderer (formerly Presenter) - With the Renderer, users can apply materials and lighting to the model and produce photorealistic images and animations.
- Quantification - By "taking off" the model, users can automatically make material estimates, measure areas and count building components.
- TimeLiner - Adds 4D simulation so the user can link geometry to times and dates and to simulate the construction or demolition of the model over time. Also links with project scheduling software (Such as Microsoft Project or Primavera products) to import task data.
- Animator - A feature that allows the users to animate the model and interact with it.
- Scripter - This allows the user to set up a collection of actions that he/she want to happen when certain events conditions are met.

== File format support ==
Navisworks Simulate and Manage are most notable for its support for a wide range of design file formats. Formats natively supported include:

- NavisWorks - .nwd, .nwf, .nwc (all versions, no full backward compatibility)
- AutoCAD Drawing - .dwg, .dxf (up to AutoCAD 2018)
- MicroStation (SE, J, V8, & XM) - .dgn, .prp, prw (up to v7, & v8)
- 3D Studio Max - .3ds, .prj (up to 3ds Max 2018)
- ACIS SAT - .sat, .sab (all ASM SAT, up to ASM SAT v7)
- DWF - .dwf, .dwfx (all versions)
- CATIA - .model, session, .exp, dlv3, .CATPart, .CATProduct, .cgr (up to v4, & v5)
- IFC - .ifc (IFC2X_PLATFORM, IFC2X_FINAL, IFC2X2_FINAL, IFC2X3, IFC4)
- IGES - *.igs*, *.iges* (all versions)
- Informatix/MicroGDS - .man, .cv7 (v10)
- Inventor - .ipt, .iam, .ipj (up to Inventor 2018)
- CIS/2 - .stp (STRUCTURAL_FRAME_SCHEMA)
- JT Open - .jt (up to v10)
- NX - .prt (up to v9)
- Revit - .rvt (up to 2011–2022)
- RVM - .rvm (up to v12.0 SP5)
- SketchUp - .skp (v5 up to 2015)
- PDS Design Review - .dri (legacy file format, support up to 2007)
- STL - .stl (binary only)
- VRML - .wrl, .wrz (VRML1, VRML2)
- Parasolid - .x_b (up to schema 26)
- FBX - .fbx (FBX SDK 2017)
- Pro/ENGINEER - .prt, .asm, .g, .neu (Wildfire v5, Creo Parametric v1-v3)
- STEP - .stp, .step (AP214, AP203E3, AP242)
- Solidworks - .prt, .sldprt, .asm, .sldasm (2001, plus 2015)
- PDF - .pdf (all versions)
- Rhino - .3dm (up to v5)
- Solid Edge - .stp, .prt

Additional products that are supported through Autodesk, and third parties:

- Revit
- MicroStation
- 3DS Max
- ArchiCAD
