= ProductCenter =

Product lifecycle management software

- ProductCenter
- Developers: SofTech Group Inc., a division of Essig PLM
- Initial release: December 1994
- Stable release: ProductCenter 9.16 / February 2026
- Operating system: Windows
- Type: PLM
- License: Proprietary
- Website: ProductCenter Website

ProductCenter is a commercial software product, that is an integrated suite of Product Lifecycle Management (PLM) software for managing product data. The software was engineered for the Microsoft Windows operating system. Along with core applications, it includes localized and web-based services. ProductCenter is suited for managing various types of CAx data, but it can be used for many forms of data management and product management.

== History ==
ProductCenter is owned, supported and maintained by Essig PLM. In the early 1990s ProductCenter was one of the earliest PDM/PLM engineering software programs known as CMS. CMS was developed by Workgroup Technology Corporation (WTC) and was the first independent PDM/PLM solution to integrate with Pro/ENGINEER and Myriad. In 1996 WTC's CMS software program was renamed to what is currently known as ProductCenter.

== Product version timeline ==
- 2026 - ProductCenter 9.16
- 2025 - ProductCenter 9.15
- 2024 - ProductCenter 9.14
- 2023 - ProductCenter 9.13
- 2022 - ProductCenter 9.12
- 2021 - ProductCenter 9.11
- 2020 - ProductCenter 9.10
- 2019 - ProductCenter 9.9
- 2018 - ProductCenter 9.8
- 2017 - ProductCenter 9.7
- 2016 - ProductCenter 9.6
- 2015 - ProductCenter 9.5
- 2014 - ProductCenter 9.4
- 2013 - ProductCenter 9.3
- 2012 - ProductCenter 9.2
- 2012 – ProductCenter 9.1
- 2009 – ProductCenter 9
- 2008 – ProductCenter 8.6
- 2007 – ProductCenter 8.6
- 2006 – ProductCenter 8.5
- 2005 – ProductCenter 8.4
- 2004 – ProductCenter 8.3
- 2003 – ProductCenter 8.2
- 2002 – ProductCenter 8.1
- 2001 – ProductCenter 8.0
- 2000 – ProductCenter 7.0
- 1999 – ProductCenter 7.0 (formerly CMS)
- 1998 – CMS 6.5
- 1996 – CMS 6
- 1994 – CMS 5

== Product features ==
ProductCenter makes the use of spreadsheets for BOM management obsolete and provides organization for parts with various part types and attributes as well as all information managed can be accessed through the ProductCenter Hierarchy Explorer. This feature helps to facilitate small to mid-size manufacturers with a way to centralize product data, control the engineering change process and share BOMs with suppliers. ProductCenter can be integrated with other tools – like CAD, ECAD, CAM, PDM and ERP – to help ease the management of product data from design to manufacturing.

ProductCenter includes these and other features:

- Bill of Information Management
- BOM Management
- Workflow Management
- Change Management (e.g. ECO's)
- Document Control and Versioning
- Compliance Management (e.g. U.S. Food and Drug Administration (FDA), ISO, RoHS, UL and others)
- Supplier & Partner Management
- Supply Chain Collaboration
- Project Collaboration
- Document Management is a component of ProductCenter that centralizes and connects many forms of product information. This component offers secure, distributed vaulting, access via the Web, version and revision control, and user customized Web Portals for the engineer. The component also offers engineers viewable file generation, and automated legacy data capture.
- Design Integration is a component of ProductCenter that integrates directly with design and support applications. The component offers many installable application modules for most of the current major commercial CAD and support products. Those applications include AutoCAD, Adobe FrameMaker, Autodesk Inventor, AutoCAD Mechanical, AutoCAD Electrical, Microsoft Office, SolidWorks, CATIA V5, and Siemens PLM Software's NX. This component helped users to solve many repetitive tasks associated with integrations to ProductCenter's PLM solution by allowing the user fast access to the data being managed.
- Configuration Control is a component of ProductCenter that provides standard organization for parts with various part types and attributes. All information is managed and accessible through the ProductCenter Hierarchy Explorer and ProductCenter BOM Editor. This component consolidates and links every information item used to design, produce, and support product data for the end user or engineer.
- Process Management is a component of ProductCenter that standardizes and automates product development and release processes across a company or enterprise. The component allows for process automation including document approvals and release, email notification, engineering change management and regulatory compliance. The module known as ProductCenter Workflow automates business processes such as design and change approvals keeping in check with regulatory requirements such as U.S. Food and Drug Administration and ISO.
- Product Collaboration is a component of ProductCenter that facilitates design reviews and collaborative product team meetings over the Web. This component stores document markups and links to original files in ProductCenter. It also allows for 3D visualization and View/Markup of numerous file formats.
- Enterprise Integration is a component of ProductCenter that enables the exchange of application-independent Bill of materials with other enterprise applications such as Material requirements planning, Enterprise resource planning, and Customer relationship management systems.

== See also ==
- Bill of materials
- Engineering Change Order
- Product Lifecycle Management
- Product Data Management
- Manufacturing process management
- Product design
- Configuration management
