= PTC Creo =

Family of computer-aided design apps

Creo
- Developer: PTC
- Release: 2011; 15 years ago
- Stable release: 12.0 / June 2025; 1 year ago
- Operating system: Windows
- Platform: Windows 11, Windows 10
- Size: Minimum RAM requirement: 4 gigabytes
- Available in: English, Chinese (Traditional, Simplified), French, German, Italian, Japanese, Korean, Spanish, Polish, Russian
- Type: CAD software
- License: Proprietary
- Website: ptc.com/en/products/cad/creo/

Creo is a family of computer-aided design (CAD) apps supporting product design for discrete manufacturers developed by PTC.

Creo runs on Microsoft Windows and provides software for 3D CAD parametric feature solid modeling, 3D direct modeling, 2D orthographic views, finite element analysis and simulation, schematic design, technical illustrations, and viewing and visualization. Creo can also be paired with the Mastercam machining based software.

== History ==
PTC began developing Creo in 2009, and announced it using the code name Project Lightning at PlanetPTC Live, in Las Vegas, in June 2010.

In October 2010, PTC unveiled the product name Creo. PTC released Creo 1.0 in June 2011.

== Software and features ==
Creo Parametric and Creo Elements compete directly with CATIA, Siemens NX/Solid Edge, and SolidWorks. The Creo suite of apps replace and supersede PTC’s products formerly known as Pro/ENGINEER, CoCreate, and ProductView.

Release history
Version	Release date
Creo 1.0	6 January 2011
Creo 2.0	27 March 2012
Creo 3.0	17 March 2014
Creo 4.0	15 December 2016
Creo 5.0	19 March 2018
Creo 6.0	19 March 2019
Creo 7.0	14 April 2020
Creo 8.0	14 April 2021
Creo 9.0	4 May 2022
Creo 10.0	18 April 2023
Creo 11.0	15 May 2024
Creo 12.0	4 June 2025
Creo 13.0	10 June 2026

== See also ==
- Autodesk Inventor
- Creo Elements/Pro
- Creo Elements/View
- FreeCAD
- I-DEAS
- Mastercam
- Parametric Technology Corporation
- Siemens NX
- Solid Edge
- SolidWorks
