= SprutCAM =

Computer-aided manufacturing software

SprutCAM X

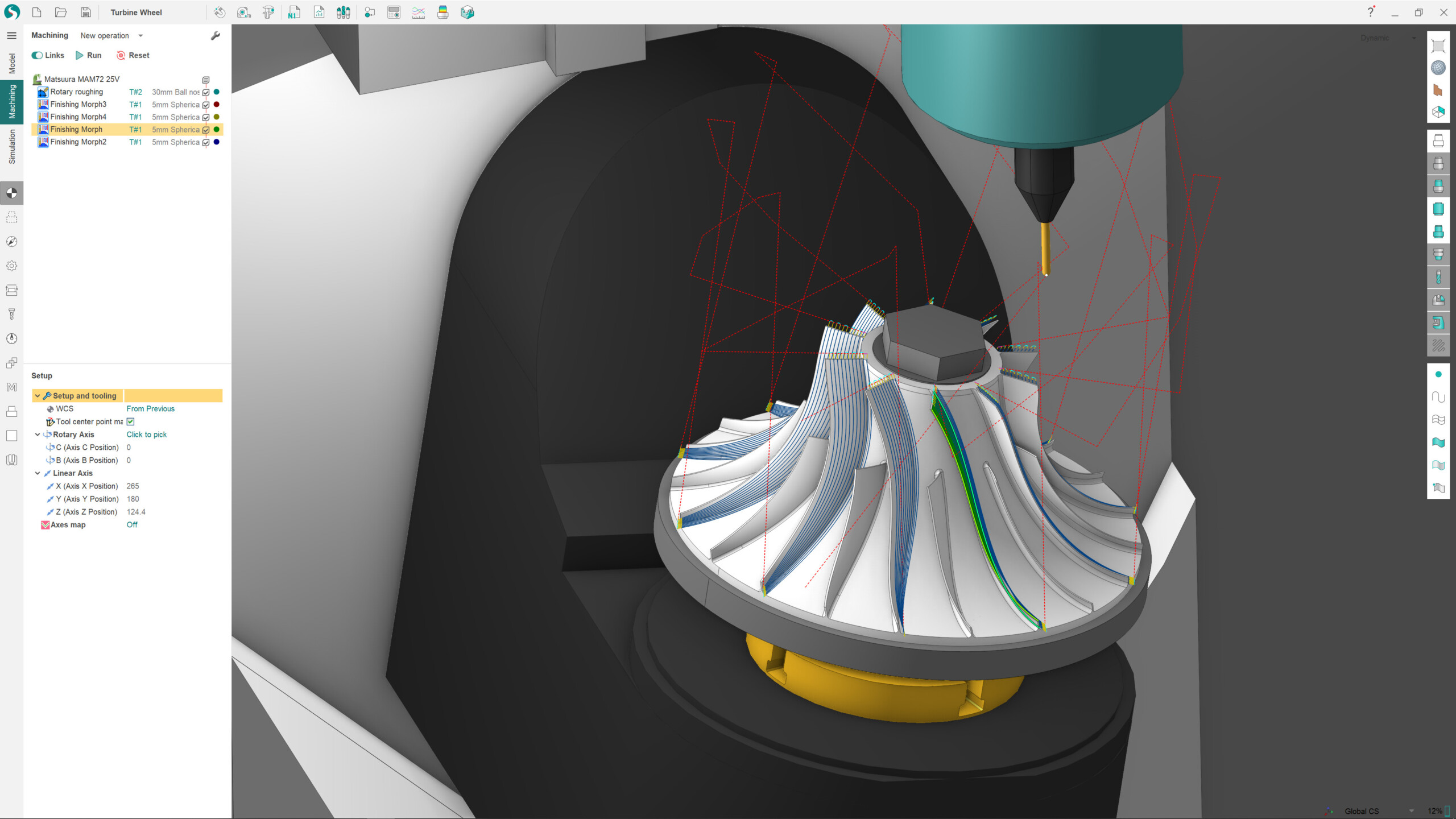
- The SprutCAM X user interface
- Developer: SprutCAM Tech Ltd.
- Initial release: 2021; 5 years ago
- Stable release: 17
- Operating system: Microsoft Windows (10 / 11)
- Platform: x86-64
- Available in: multilingual
- Type: CAM
- License: Proprietary
- Website: www.sprutcam.com

SprutCAM X is a high-level Computer-Aided Manufacturing (CAM) software that provides off-line features for programming of various CNC machines used for cutting, wire electrical discharge (EDM), 2, 3, and multi axial (CNC Swiss-Type Lathe) machining.

The program was developed by SprutCAM Tech Ltd based in Limassol, Cyprus.

SprutCAM only supports Microsoft Windows 10/11 version.

== History ==
SPRUT Technology, LTD. was founded in 1987 by Alexander Kharadziev, who recruited a team of engineers to build a company for developing CAx software, with its headquarters at Naberezhnye Chelny, Russia, and released its known product, SprutCAM, in 1997. This is one of the oldest Russian developers of PC-based CAx software.

The headquarters is now located in Limassol, Cyprus.

=== Version history ===
Past Versions

- SprutCAM X 16 (May, 2022)

Current Version:

- SprutCAM X 17 (September, 2023)

=== System requirements ===
The system requirements for SprutCAM:

	Minimum (small and medium projects)	Recommended (large projects)
OS	Windows 10	Windows 11
CPU	64-bit	64-bit
Memory	8 GB RAM	32 GB RAM
Video	OpenGL-capable card (OpenGL 1.2) 512 MB	OpenGL-capable card (OpenGL 1.5) 1 GB or higher
Storage	HDD with at least 5GB free space	Solid State Drive (SSD) with at least 10GB free space
Monitor	1920x1080	4K, dual monitors
Pointing Device	Mouse	Mouse and 3Dconnexion 3D mouse
Internet	-	Internet connection

=== Computer aided design products ===
- SolidWorks
- IRONCAD
- AutoCAD
- Inventor
- SolidEdge
- Alibre Design
- PowerShape
- Rhinoceros 3D
- SpaceClaim
- NX

SprutCAM X works with associative CAD geometry and toolpaths; this allows modified geometry or machining parameters to quickly obtain updated toolpaths.

== File format ==
SprutCAM X opens/saves following file formats:

- SprutCAM Files (*.stc, *.stcx)
- Operation/Parameters Files (*.sto)
- IGES: *.igs, *.iges
- STL: *.stl
- PostScript: *.ps, *.eps
- DXF: *.dxf
- Rhinoceros: *3dm
- Sprut Models: *.sgm
- Parasolid: *.x_t, *.x_b
- STEP: *.stp, *.step
- Sprut geometry format: *.sgf
- SOLIDWORKS: *.sldprt, *.sldasm
- SolidEdge: *.par, *.psm, *.pwd, *.asm
- PLY: *.ply
- AMF: *.amf
- Toolpath: *.xml, *.txt
- Template: *.html
- Postprocessors: *.sppx, *.spp, *.ppp, *.inp

Export/Convert following Formats via CAD Plugin as Background Process to IGES an Import:

- Rhinoceros: *.3dm
- Cobalt: *.co
- PowerShape: *.fic, *.model, *.psmodel, *.dgk, *.pfm, *.x_b, *.xmt_bin, *.x_t, *.xmt_txt, *.stp, *.step, *.prt, *.par, *.sldprt, *.vda
- Autodesk: *.iam, *.idw, *.ipt, *.ipn, *.ide, *.prt, *.asm, *.sat, *.ste, *.step, *.dwg, *.dxf, *.iges, *.igs
- Rhinoceros: *.3dm, *.rws, *.3ds, *.stp, *.step, *.raw, *.wrl, *.vrml, *.ai, *.eps, *.lwo, *.spl, *.vda, *.dwg, *.dxf, *.dgn, *.sldprt, *.sldasm
- SolidEdge: *.asm, *.dft, *.par, *.psm, *.mds, *.pwd, *.dgn, *.dxf, *.dwg, *.prt, *.sat, *.stp, *.step, *.x_b, *.xmt_bin, *.x_t, *.xmt_txt
- SOLIDWORKS: *.sldasm, *.asm, *.sldprt, *.prt, *.slddrw, *.drw, *.x_b, *.xmt_bin, *.x_t, *.xmt_txt, *.stp, *.step
- T-FLEX: *.grb

== See also ==
- CAx
- CNC
- Machining
- Off-line robot programming
