= T-FLEX CAD =

Parametric CAD software application

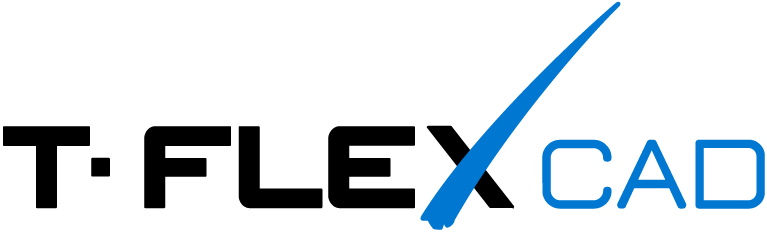

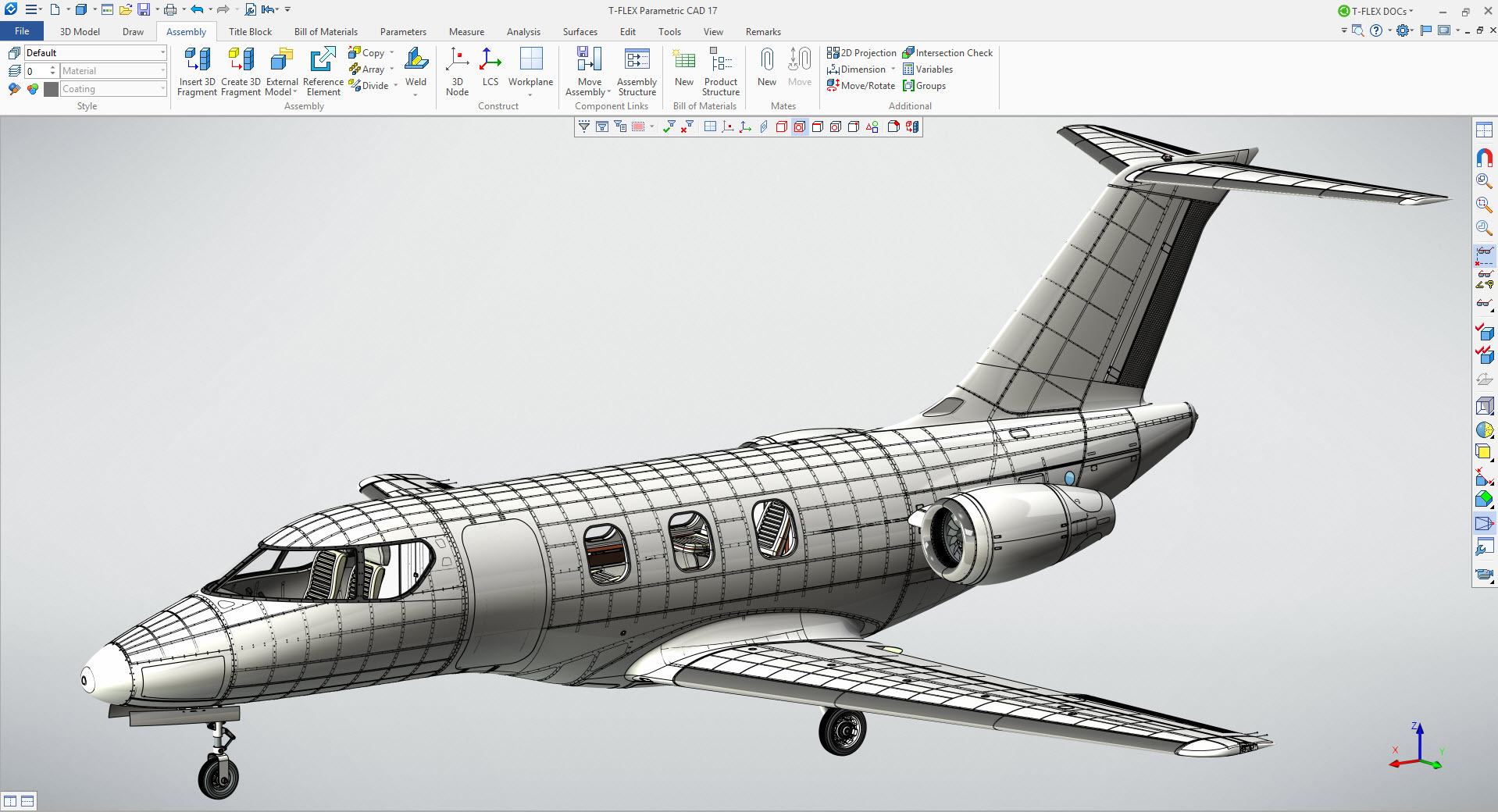
- T-FLEX Parametric CAD
- Developer: Top Systems
- Initial release: 1992
- Stable release: 17.1.15.0 / Jun 2024
- Operating system: Windows (7,8.1,10,11)
- Type: CAD software
- License: Proprietary
- Website: https://www.tflex.com/

T-FLEX CAD (T-FLEX) – is a parametric computer-aided design (CAD) software application for 2D design, drafting, and 3D solid modeling based on commercial Parasolid geometric kernel. It's primarily developed and distributed by Russian software company Top Systems. Supported platforms are limited to Microsoft Windows. Amongst features T-FLEX offers support for various CAD formats and diverse localizations.

== Functionality ==
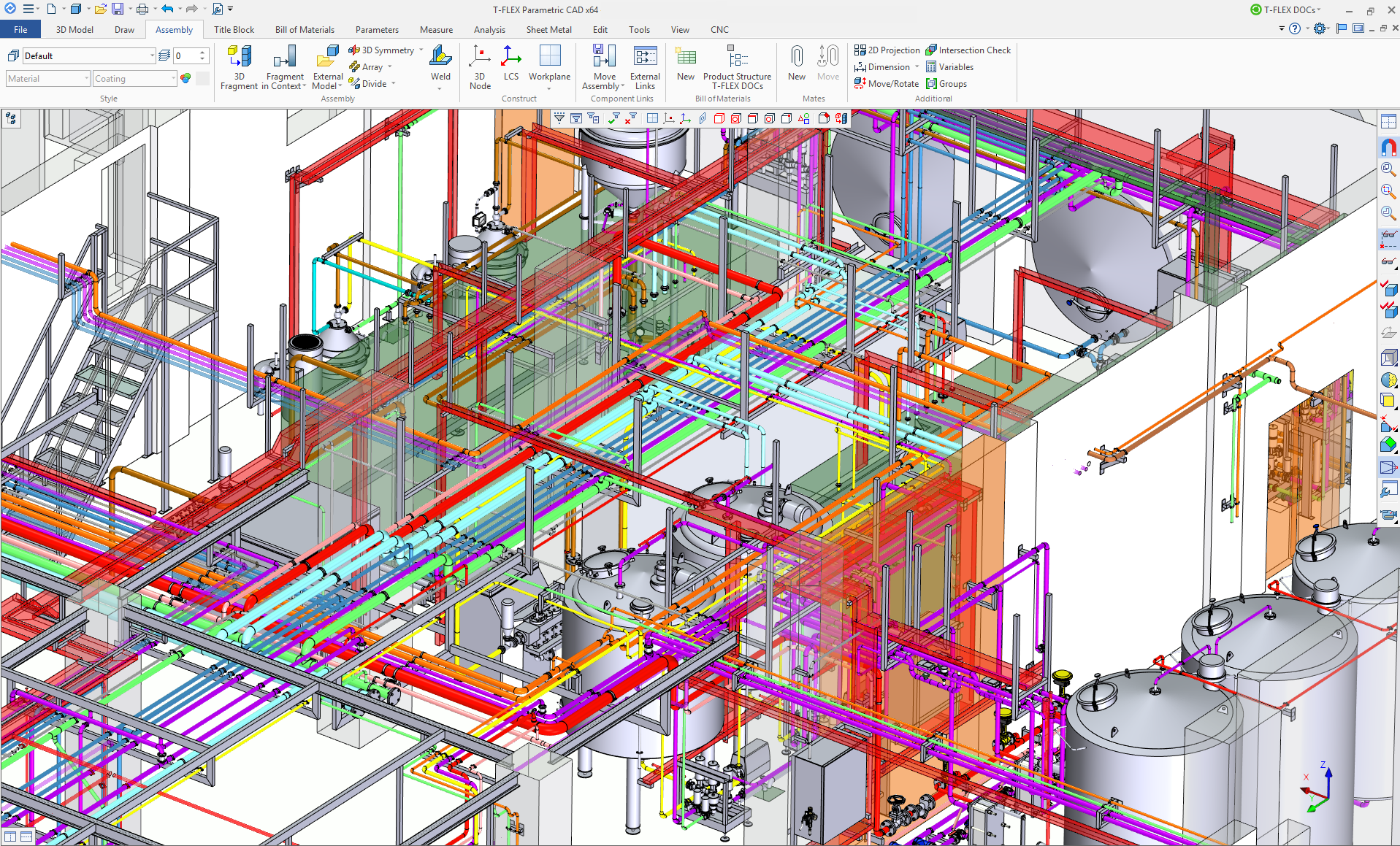
T-FLEX CAD with some MEP functionality

T-FLEX CAD provides parametric, adaptive and associative technology aimed at family-of-parts manufacturers or other design situations that use similar geometry but require many different sizes or permutations. Entities and their parameters in T-FLEX CAD can be related to each other. Variables can be assigned for component names, visibility, material, any numeric or text attribute of any entity. They can then be processed with algebraic or logical expression to control the behavior of the design.

== File formats ==
T-FLEX native file format is *.grb

=== Compatibility ===
T-FLEX CAD supports parasolid-compatible file formats, including:

- IGES
- STEP
- Rhino
- DWG, DXF
- SolidWorks
- Solid Edge
- Autodesk Inventor

== See also ==
- Comparison of CAD Software
