= VoluMill =

Manufacturing software

- A 3-axis high speed roughing toolpath shown in VoluMill Universal
- Developer: Celeritive
- Operating system: Windows
- Type: CAM High Speed Machining / Ultra High Performance Toolpath
- License: Proprietary
- Website: VoluMill website

VoluMill is Computer Aided Manufacturing software developed by Celeritive Technologies that produces a toolpath designed for High Speed Machining applications. These applications include all 2-axis and 3-axis rough milling tasks, from simple prismatic parts to complex freeform molds. VoluMill is offered as a standalone version called VoluMill Universal, which is designed to work with any CAM system, and also as integrated versions that run inside hyperMILL, GibbsCAM, BobCAD-CAM, SigmaNEST, Mastercam, and NX (Unigraphics), RTM (Lemoine Technologies)

VoluMill was created to address the four problem areas of traditional toolpaths:

- The initial full cut into the material
- Stepping over between cuts
- Feeding into new areas of the part
- Overloading in corners

== See also ==
- Computer-aided manufacturing
