= Cortime =

Optimization tool for 3D CAD

CORTIME
- Founded: 18-12-2012
- Founder: Thøger Kari Jensen, Danny Malkowski, and Rasmus Høtoft Sørensen (CEO)
- Headquarters: Hollændervej 23B, Frederiksberg

CORTIME is an optimization tool for 3D CAD published by Apiosoft company. Cortime automates the design exploration, optimization and testing. A user with SolidWorks licence can work on Cortime.

== Timeline ==
CORTIME was founded based on an idea originated from a Ph.D. project from Thøger Kari Jensen at Aalborg University in 2013. In 2016, Rasmus Høtoft Sørensen joined Apiosoft as CEO.

== Release history ==
In February 2017, CORTIME beta version was released at Los Angeles, USA. CORTIME will initially be sold through SolidWorks and reseller worldwide on a SaaS model.

== About ==
CORTIME integrates with SolidWorks CAD program with the optimization algorithms that enables users to optimize their designs automatically. Users can download CORTIME software from Apiosoft's website. Engineers can include several variables in their calculations while making it faster. It will help engineers in developing turbines blades, ship rotors, light sources, refrigeration systems and many more.

== Model set up ==
CORTIME can set up optimization models in 3 steps.

- Define objectives
- Assign variables
- Configure the optimization algorithm
