= ASD OptiPlant =

OptiPlant is a computer-aided engineering (CAE) software application for 3D conceptual design. OptiPlant is manufactured and sold by ASD Global. OptiPlant is a 3D knowledge based automation tool with 3D parametric modeling of equipment and structures, interference-free pipe router and tray router, and engineering analytics solely for Microsoft Windows Operating system.

== Overview ==
=== Features ===
OptiPlant's features include 3D parametric modeling of equipment and structures, 3D interference-free auto-routing of pipe, tray, and conduit, as well as automated engineering analysis for stress, and hydraulics.

=== Modeling ===
OptiPlant provides multiple methods to model 3D equipment and structures. There is a library of pre-defined equipment and structures for a pick and place approach. Or users can load dimensional data through excel files for automated 3D modeling. Plot-Plan Layout Rules or Equipment Layout Rules enable the user to check for the spacing between any objects modeled in OptiPlant for the confirmation against their project's safety and maintenance standards or against PIP spacing standards.

=== Auto Routing ===
Many companies have attempted development of automatic routing technology for piping and other commodities. One of the approaches followed was vector shooting or definitions of pre-defined paths supported by rules which had to be entered by the user. This approach processes quickly but limits the usage to specific types of facilities and requires a huge amount of time for the user to build in the rules. Ultimately the benefits of automation are then not realized because the user has spent so much time with the rules. Also the final results from this approach have not shown high levels of accuracy.

Another approach followed was the generate-and-test approaches where a trial route is generated and tested for satisfaction of constraints. This also leads to unpredictable results where each route has to be validated.

OptiPlant's approach leveraged a full space search using a robotics-based algorithm from Stanford University. This approach employs an A* search algorithm with embedded constraint knowledge to find the best sequence of nodes between the start and end of the route. A* search is widely used algorithm for path finding and is recognized for is performance and accuracy. It uses a best-first search and finds a least cost path from a given initial node to a goal node. It traverses the graph to follow a path of the lowest total cost or distance. It also leverages a knowledge plus heuristic cost function of each node. The embedded constraints spans data related to the engineering of the system, to the spatial and mechanical requirements and to the overall cost of the final result. Therefore, the results are highly accurate, and the algorithm can be applied in all types of industrial facilities from offshore, onshore, chemical, and power facilities.

=== Interoperability ===
OptiPlant provides extended interface capability in the form of DATA EXCHANGE FORMAT (DXF), which can be read as input for major third-party software. This enables the objects created in OptiPlant to be used in other visualization packages like AutoCAD, Microstation, AutoPlant, SmartPlant P&ID, S3D, Navisworks, PDMS (software) etc. The output in DXF format is an intelligent output-carrying Line IDs, Equipment IDs and colors as well. OptiPlant generates ISO 15926 compliant XML files for Equipment, Structures, and Piping.
