= Lightwork Design Ltd. =

Software companies of the United Kingdom

- Industry: 3D rendering software
- Founded: 1989; 37 years ago
- Headquarters: Sheffield, United Kingdom
- Key people: David Forrester, CEO
- Products: Lightworks author, lightworks iray+
- Website: www.lightworkdesign.com

Lightwork Design Ltd. is a computer software company specialising in 3D Rendering software. Its headquarters are in Sheffield, United Kingdom.

== Early history ==
Lightworks was founded in Sheffield in 1989, with the goal to create a software toolkit for producing photorealistic renders from 3D geometry. While originally based in the Sheffield Science Park, Lightworks is now based in Rutledge House, a building situated next to the Sheffield Botanical Gardens and originally built in the 1850s as the Victoria Park Hotel. The first Lightworks product was demonstrated at the 1990 Autofact exhibition in Detroit, USA. Sales of the initial Lightworks product commenced in early 1991, and the company signed their first major CAD developer, Unigraphics (now Siemens) in 1993. The company signed their first international customer, CPU of Japan, in 1994. In 1995 Lightworks began to develop the MachineWorks toolkit. This led to the foundation of MachineWorks, which is now a separate company. In 1997, Lightworks launched a large model navigation system called Navisworks, which was sold in 2007 to Autodesk for $26 million. In 1999, Lightworks and Intel formed a partnership, and the company started to develop their products for the Linux platform.

== Recent developments ==
=== Partnership with NVIDIA ===
At SIGGRAPH 2013, Lightworks announced a new partnership with NVIDIA to develop an SDK to provide access to NVIDIA's Iray technology. This SDK, called Iray+, is intended to provide physically accurate ray-tracing to clients who need to present their products to customers, and will have the ability to use cloud- and network-based rendering.

== Products ==
Lightworks' current products are Lightworks Author and Iray+.

=== Lightworks Author ===
Lightworks Author was the first product launched by Lightwork Design. The main use of the product is in architectural design, interior design, engineering, and automotive design. The software works across Mac OS X, Windows, and Linux, in 32- and 64-bit binaries.

=== Lightworks Iray+ ===
Lightworks Iray+ was introduced at SIGGRAPH 2013. It uses the GPU-accelerated ray tracing engine developed by the NVIDIA Advanced Rendering Center to provide interactive product visualisations. Lightworks are also developing an Iray plugin for 3DS Max.

== Previous products ==
=== Artisan ===
In its 20th year, Lightworks announced a new product called Lightworks Artisan at SIGGRAPH 2009. Also known as Renditioner for Trimble's SketchUp, this is a ready-to-deliver rendering product that is used alongside CAD/CAM programmes such as GstarCAD, ZWCAD, BricsCAD, Kubotek's KeyCreator, and several others. In 2010, Artisan was integrated with Ascon's Kompas 3D and BeLight Software. The product introduced a number of new technologies including SnapShot capabilities and pre-loaded content libraries. It is aimed towards 3D designers who want to create realistic images using a CAD programme. "SnapShot technology" refers to the ability to record the state of storage at any given moment. In Artisan, this allows users to save their renders at different stages, so that they may return to those stages and alter selected elements, such as textures, colour, or background images. Since 2014, Artisan has been marketed and sold by Pictorex Ltd.

== Customers and Partners ==
Partners include Siemens, NVIDIA, and Spatial, while customers include PTC, Graphisoft, ACA, and Ascon.

== Other information ==
Every year, Lightworks selects a local charity to support through fundraising events. In 2013, Lightworks raised money for Bluebell Wood Children's Hospice, while in 2014 the company is sponsoring a week of breakfasts at the Cathedral Archer project, a homelessness charity. A team from Lightworks is undertaking the "Ben Nevis Challenge" in June 2014, while the Lightworks running team, "Runworks", competes in the yearly Sheffield Half Marathon corporate charity running challenge, most recently running the "cancelled" 2014 race.
