= Autodesk Fusion =

Computer-aided design (CAD) software application

Fusion

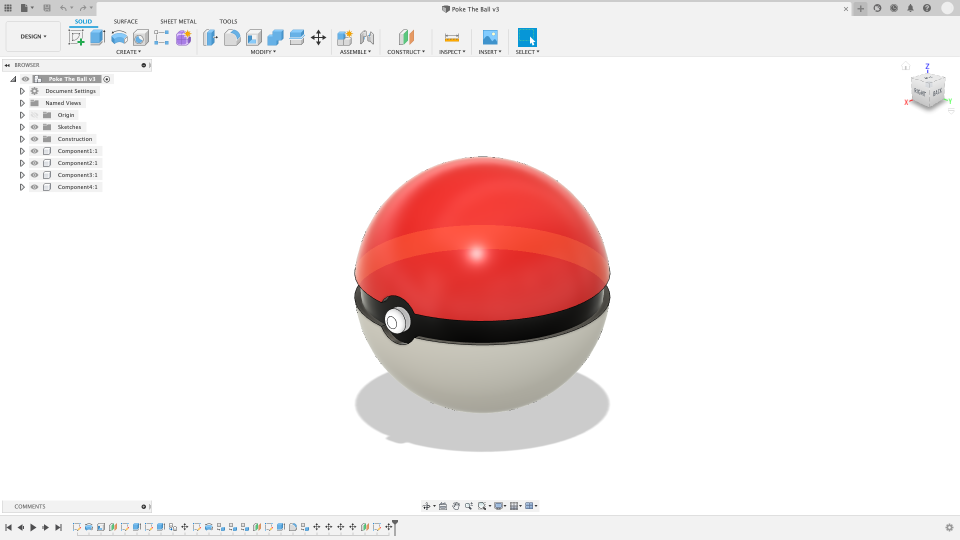
- Developer: Autodesk
- Release: September 24, 2013; 13 years ago
- Stable release: 2706.1.17 / October 28, 2026; 1 day ago
- Operating system: Windows, macOS, web browser, Android, iOS
- Available in: English, German, French, Italian, Spanish, Korean, Chinese, Japanese, Portuguese, Polish, Turkish
- Type: Computer-aided design, computer-aided manufacturing, computer-aided engineering, printed circuit board design
- License: Trialware
- Website: www.autodesk.com/products/fusion-360/overview

Autodesk Fusion (formerly Fusion 360) is a computer-aided design (CAD), computer-aided manufacturing (CAM), computer-aided engineering (CAE) and printed circuit board (PCB) design software application, developed by Autodesk. It is available for Windows, macOS and web browsers, with simplified view-only applications available for Android and iOS. Fusion is a commercial software product, licensed as a paid subscription; a free limited home-based, non-commercial personal edition is available.

== History ==
Fusion was introduced by Autodesk on 24 September 2013. It incorporated many features from Inventor Fusion, which it replaced.

- In 2009, the tech demo Inventor Fusion was released.
- In the summer of 2013, Fusion 360 was publicly announced as a cloud-enabled version of the original.
- In January 2024, Fusion was rebranded, dropping the '360' from the previous product name 'Fusion 360'.

After release, other Autodesk products were integrated into Autodesk Fusion:

- In 2017, the Slicer feature of Autodesk 123D was integrated.
- In 2021, Autodesk Meshmixer was discontinued, after functionality was integrated into Fusion 360.
- In 2021, Netfabb was merged into Fusion 360.

== Features ==
Fusion has built-in capabilities for 3D modeling, collaboration, simulation and documentation. It can manage manufacturing processes such as machining, milling, turning and additive manufacturing. It also has Electronic design automation (EDA) features, such as schematic design, PCB design and component management. It can be also used for rendering, animation, generative design and a number of advanced simulation tasks (FEA).

Fusion uses a number of cloud-based AI functions, e.g. for drawing views, automated modelling, generative design, sketch constraints.

== Extensions ==
Autodesk offers a number of paid extensions that add extra functionality to Fusion. These extensions are priced through a monthly or yearly subscription.

- Simulation - lets a Fusion team analyze performance and manufacturability of models using structural and thermal simulation tools. Also includes generative design tools built to improve and optimize models using manufacturing process-aware artificial intelligence.
- Manufacturing (formerly 'Machining') - adds additional CAM (computer aided manufacturing) abilities inside Fusion to produce higher quality parts and adds tools to create optimized multi-sheet layouts for CNC cutting. Added tools are also included for Part inspection and setup and additive build set up and simulation, including metal-based 3D printing. Also includes tools to generate support structures and create precise subtractive machining operations (3-to-5-axis CNC machining), nesting and simulation build processes.
- Product Design - includes advanced 3D design and modeling tools. These tools help with complex product designs using intelligent software to better analyze and improve models.
- Manage - allows for tools that assist engineering workflows and keep all product data secure and trackable.
- Signal Integrity - unlocks additional PCB and electronic signal integrity tools. Easily improve and analyze PCB prototypes.

== Languages, compatibility ==
Autodesk Fusion supports Windows 11 (and 10), plus the latest versions of MacOS. It is also available as a web browser version. In its preferences, multiple languages are selectable: English, German, French, Italian, Spanish, Korean, Chinese, Japanese, Portuguese, Polish, Turkish (and Czech, through a free add-on).

== Licensing ==
Fusion has split licensing levels into four different options for users to choose from. The first of these options is Fusion for personal use, which is free and has limited functionality. Fusion for startup use is also free but contains all existing software capabilities and requires approval. Another free option is Fusion for students and educators, which works similarly to the previous licensing. The last license level is Fusion commercial, which is paid and allows access all current base features. Additional advanced productivity tools are available as extensions.

== Market share ==
According to a survey of 500 users conducted by CNCCookbook.com, Fusion has continued to own a large percentage of the CAD package market share throughout 2018 and 2021. This software's wide range of features and pricing make it a choice for beginners, hobbyists, and professionals. Fusion, as of 2021, dominated the CAD package market share when it came to overall top packages and hobbyist purchases. However, SolidWorks owned a larger percentage of the market share in 2019–2021 in regard to the number of paid packages and professional users. Being the industry standard, SolidWorks attracts mainly professionals and businesses that are willing to pay monthly or annual subscription fees.

== See also ==
- Autodesk Inventor
- Autodesk AutoCAD
- Autodesk Fusion Electronics (EAGLE)
- Comparison of computer-aided design software
- List of 3D printing software
