= Applicon =

American software corporation

Applicon Inc.
- Type: Private company
- Industry: Software
- Founded: 1969
- Founder: Fontaine Richardson, Gary Hornbuckle, Richard N. Spann and Harry Lee
- Defunct: 1980
- Fate: Acquired
- Successor: Schlumberger
- Headquarters: Burlington, Massachusetts, United States
- Products: Computer Aided Design and Manufacturing (CAD/CAM) systems

Applicon, Incorporated was one of the first manufacturers of Computer Aided Design and Manufacturing (CAD/CAM) systems. It was co-founded in 1969 in Bedford, Massachusetts by four founders working at the MIT Lincoln Lab: Fontaine Richardson who earned a Ph.D. degree in computer science from the University of Illinois in 1968, Gary Hornbuckle who had received a Ph.D. from University of California, Berkeley, and Richard N. Spann and Harry Lee who received degrees from Massachusetts Institute of Technology.

Gary Hornbuckle was President of Applicon until it was sold to Schlumberger. During the 1970s and early 1980s, the company had its headquarters and R&D facility in Burlington, Massachusetts, while its manufacturing facility was in Billerica, Massachusetts. Applicon was acquired by Schlumberger in 1980, at which point Richardson and Hornbuckle left the company. At the time, Applicon had over $100 million in annual revenue.

In 1986 Schlumberger management combined its Applicon division with another entity which it had acquired, Manufacturing Data Systems, Inc. (MDSI), to create the Schlumberger CAD/CAM division, siting its main office in Ann Arbor, Michigan. In 1993, Schlumberger sold this division to Gore Enterprises, and in turn Gore sold it in 1999 to UGS Corp., a 1996 spin-off of Electronic Data Systems, which was later acquired by Siemens AG.

== History of systems ==
Early Applicon products (circa 1970s) ran on DEC PDP-11 minicomputers. Applicon modified the DEC operating system, which was then a single-user OS, to one of the world's first multi-user operating systems. One of DEC's first multi-user OS was created with help from Applicon. (DEC's first multi-user DEC operating system was reportedly its RSTS-11 (Resource Sharing Time Sharing), which had been created for the educational marketplace).

Another Applicon innovation was the ability to input commands using drawn character recognition. (See Patent 4560830). Early CAD provided a stylus and tablet instead of a mouse for a user interface. The tablet was mapped to the screen i.e. the top-left and bottom-right of the screen and the tablet were mapped to the same points.

Applicon provided the ability to train the system to interpret characters drawn on the tablet and to associate them with commands to the system. For example, drawing the symbol for alpha could mean "execute". Commands could consist of more than one symbol, for example two dots could be interpreted as "move relative" which would move the currently selected items by the distance between points p1 and p2 where the dots indicate the location of the points. The character recognition worked only because multiple symbol shapes were mapped to each command. 2 and Z would be nearly indistinguishable by the system. To tell the difference, multiple strokes would be required. ".2" ".Z" might be mapped to "2" while "/2" and "/Z" would be mapped to "Z" Any error a user made drawing a command sketch could trigger a command the user was not expecting. This was an irritant because of the large number of poorly documented User Defined (community contributed) commands contained in the software package. A user suspecting they'd drawn wrong would invariably continue to randomly scribble in order to avoid any possible matches.

At this time, Applicon's software was written entirely in DEC's assembler language. A four workstation system had typically only about 64K words of memory. A word was 16 bits long. Program code was swapped in and out of memory using what was then called memory overlay techniques. Magnetic core memory was used until around 1979. Work stations used storage tube displays. Hard drives used removable platters and were as large as washing machines. A four workstation system cost about $400,000 in 1970s dollars including a pen plotter which cost about $60,000 (Xynetics plotter). At this time, only large companies could afford to use CAD machines and they had to man the workstations three shifts a day because of the cost.

In the mid to late 1970s, Applicon systems were used to design LSIs (large scale integrated circuits) and later VLSI (very large scale integrated circuits), the precursors of today's dense computer chips. It was also used for mechanical and electrical diagrams engineering projects such as power plant design.

Bravo! could have had the first integrated PDM system which was called the "Librarian". Files were stored in the library and could be checked out and referenced into assemblies. Once placed back into the library, assemblies that referenced parts would be updated.

The end of Applicon came in 1989 when it partnered with PTC and sold a product called Mechanical Design Assistant. Some of Applicon's biggest customers like Otis elevator and StorageTek used this software (which later became Pro/Engineer); they became some of PTC's biggest customers.
