= NC Graphics =

- Industry: software
- Founded: 1977
- Founder: Arthur Flutter
- Successor: Parametric Technology Corporation
- Headquarters: Waterbeach, Cambridge, England

NC Graphics was founded by Arthur Flutter in Waterbeach, Cambridge, England, in 1977 after completing a PhD in Computer Aided Design at CADCentre. This work became the basis of Toolmaker, a product that has been sold by the company since then.

In the mid-1980s the company collaborated with C&J Clark to write shoe design software until a dispute about the intellectual property rights over the product caused a falling-out. C&J Clark sued NC Graphics and won the case and NC Graphics was no longer able to develop or sell the shoe design software that they had been contracted to develop for C&J Clark.

NC Graphics focused on developing a surface modelling software product that used polynomial mathematics and was driven by human-readable input commands based on the APT language. The initial product was called Polyapt and was sold initially to manufacturing companies that specialised in producing lost wax dies for aerofoil and turbine engine blades.

In the late 1980s NC Graphics collaborated with Hurco whereby NC Graphics developed the software and Hurco marketed it worldwide. The product was marketed by Hurco as TDM3000 on a global exclusive basis. At the same time, the same fundamental source code was sold through a company in Aylesbury called VanDix and the product was marketed by them as the "VanDix" CADCAM system. Around 1990 NC Graphics and Hurco parted company after Hurco discovered that their global exclusivity agreement had been breached. Hurco obtained joint copyright to the software source code and continued to develop it before abandoning CADCAM development in the mid-1990s.

NC Graphics picked up the UK customer base from Hurco and sold what was to become "Toolmaker" until they were finally bought out by PTC some years later.

In 1993 the company formed a partnership with DEPO GmbH and began development of machining STRATEGIST, a graphical based system limited solely to generating 3-axis Cnc instructions. This product was resold by DEPO in Germany and sometimes the rest of the world under the brand name Depocam. machining STRATEGIST, was sold in the UK and some of the rest of the world, but Depocam and machining STRATEGIST were one and the same product marketed with a different brand name.

In late 2001 NC Graphics licensed Vero International Software to use their software as a Computer-aided manufacturing Geometric modeling kernel within their system. In June 2002 they bought the machining STRATEGIST product and development team for £1.25million, leaving NC Graphics with rights to its own copy of the source code and the Depocam product.

NC Graphics' business was in decline, and this was largely due to the Toolmaker product reaching the end of its product lifecycle. Sales of Toolmaker dwindled to virtually nothing and the DepoCAM product was not sufficient itself to generate sufficient revenues to keep the company going. CNC Software licensed the DepoCAM technology for $1,000,000 and this revenue kept NC Graphics going until the acquisition by PTC.

On 16 May 2007 Parametric Technology Corporation acquired NC Graphics from Arthur Flutter for $7.2million, stating that it had 15 employees at the time. In its press briefing PTC confirmed that NC Graphics technology was licensed to 5 of the top 10 CAM vendors, including CNC Software (sellers of MasterCAM). The Depocam product is to be released as Pro/TOOLMAKER 8.1 in August 2007.

On 1 June 2009 the German reseller of the software and Arthur Flutter bought back a source code license of Depocam with full global exploitation rights from PTC and rehired some of the original employees to continue development and support of the product.

== Products ==
- Toolmaker
- machining STRATEGIST (until June 2002)
- Depocam
