= ASi-Profile =

3D CAD software by ITB Paul Schneider

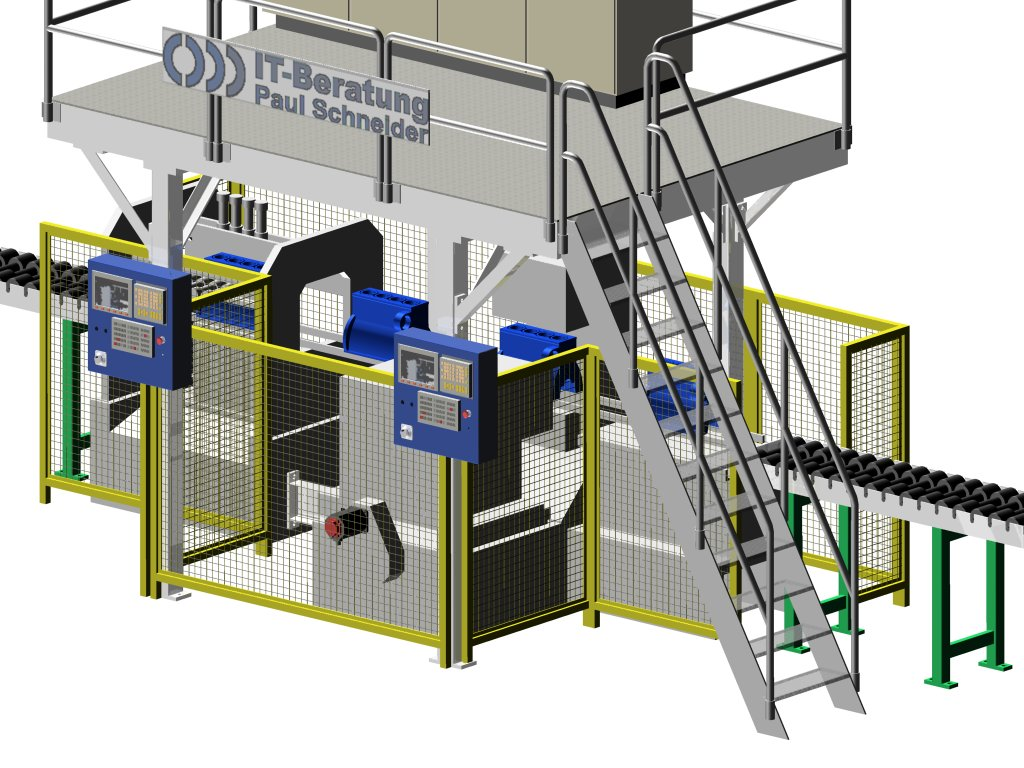
- Developer(s): ITB Paul Schneider
- Stable release: 16.0.n EN for Autodesk Inventor 2016 / May 2015
- Operating system: Windows 7 and 8/8.1
- Type: CAD
- License: Proprietary
- Website: asi-profile.de

ASi-Profile is a 3D-CAD add-on application for Autodesk Inventor developed by company ITB Paul Schneider.

== Uses ==
The software aims to extend the field of application of Autodesk Inc.'s CAD software Autodesk Inventor, which is usually used for mechanical construction in mechanical engineering and plant engineering. ASi-Profile enables the user to create supporting structures, substructures, control- and maintenance platforms, stairways, barriers, etc. which are typical elements in the constructional steelwork area.

=== Use in mechanical engineering, plant engineering ===
Conventional 3D CAD systems for mechanical engineering usually lack of functions to create steel constructions. As an add-on application, the software tries to fill the gap between mechanical engineering and constructional steelworking, enabling the designer, for example, to create a supporting frame for a machine or the required maintenance platform in the same software.

=== Use in locksmithing, metal fabrication ===
The scope in locksmithing and metal fabrication is often to plan and design stairways, platforms, balconies or railings, etc., with the intention of creating a customized, individual structure, setting a special focus on its design. ASi-Profile is used to simplify the construction process and to create realistic views of the structures.

== Distribution, Platforms ==
The software is being used and distributed worldwide by local dealers, who assume user training and support.

Available for:

- Base software: Autodesk Inventor 5 to 2016
- Operating systems: Windows Win7 und Win8/8.1 (32 + 64 Bit)

== Version history ==
- 2000: First version 1.0.0 for Inventor 5
- 2009: Version 9.0.x for Inventor 2010
- 2010: Version 10.0.x for Inventor 2011
- 2011: Version 12.0.x for Inventor 2012
- 2012: version 13.2.n for Inventor 2013
- 2013: version 14.1.n for Inventor 2014
- 2014: version 15.0.n for Inventor 2015
- 2015: version 16.0.n for Inventor 2016
