= Power Surfacing =

- Developer: nPower Software
- Operating system: Windows
- Platform: SOLIDWORKS
- Type: Computer-aided design
- License: Proprietary
- Website: http://www.npowersoftware.com/

Power Surfacing is a computer-aided design software that allows users to create and edit complex freeform surfaces in SOLIDWORKS. It is developed by nPower Software, a division of IntegrityWare Inc., and is available as an add-in for SOLIDWORKS.

== Overview ==
Power Surfacing uses subdivision surface (Sub-D) modeling and Non-uniform rational B-spline (NURBS) modeling methods together, to provide a flexible and intuitive way of designing organic shapes with high quality class A surfaces. Users can create and manipulate Sub-D models inside SOLIDWORKS, and convert them to NURBS models that are compatible with SOLIDWORKS features and commands. Power Surfacing also supports reverse engineering of scanned meshes with Power Surfacing RE, a separate add-in that can reconstruct Sub-D models from polygonal meshes.

Power Surfacing is designed for industrial design, product design, automotive design, jewelry design, and other applications that require complex freeform surfaces. It aims to simplify the design process and reduce the editing time for organic shapes, compared to traditional surface creation methods. It also provides video tutorials and examples to help users learn how to use the software effectively.

== Features ==
Some of the features of Power Surfacing include:

- Subdivision surface creation and editing inside of SOLIDWORKS
- Import of Sub-D meshes from modo, 3ds Max, etc.
- Intuitive on-screen editing with push-pull methodology
- Supports downstream features like fillet, shell, cut, extrude
- Creates high quality class A surfaces by default
- Tightly integrated with SOLIDWORKS, works with all SOLIDWORKS commands
- Reverse engineer scanned meshes with Power Surfacing RE

== Usage ==
Power Surfacing functions as a generative design tool, generating iterative, evolutionary results based on initial constraints.

This tool is commonly used to optimize manufacturing processes for parts in various industries, such as automotive, packaging design, and medical implants.

Power Surfacing can also reverse-engineer the shapes of 3D-scanned objects and recreate their geometry algorithmically, facilitating reproduction through industrial production processes. This capability can be employed to digitally replicate physical aspects of human anatomy, such as bones, and modify the model to produce precise-fitting physical Prosthesis for patients.
