= Micro Engineering Solutions =

American software company

Micro Engineering Solutions, Inc. was a CAD/CAM (Computer Aided Design / Computer Aided Manufacturing) software company founded in 1986 by Lynn and Jim Hock and Bill Harris in Farmington, Michigan. The initial product was "Solution 3000", a PC-based CAD/CAM system that ran on a standard IBM PC AT (or clone), running under IBM PC DOS, with 640 KB of memory. Additional required hardware included a math coprocessor, a 20 MB hard disk drive with floppy disk backup, a graphics display interface, and a graphics monitor.

Solution 3000 featured true full 3D modeling capability, including both design and manufacturing capabilities. Optional packages included:

Advanced Surfacing / NC Machining Advanced Conversion Programs: IGES (Initial Graphics Exchange Specification), DXF (AutoCAD Format), DES (General Motors), Ford Standard Tape, and Chrysler's format.

In 1990, Micro Engineering Solutions, Inc. was purchased by a group of investors that included Morganthaler Ventures, 3I Ventures, and GeoCapital.

In 1991, the Board appointed Ken Spenser as president and CEO.

On October 19, 1992, Autodesk Inc, Sausalito CA acquired Micro Engineering Solutions.
