= MazaCAM =

CNC programming system

MazaCAM is a CNC programming system for the Mazak CNC (Numerical control) machine-tools (see Yamazaki Mazak Corporation), sold and supported by SolutionWare Corporation.

MazaCAM differs from most other CNC programming systems in that it can generate CNC programs in both Mazatrol and G-code .

- Mazatrol Editor—Create new Mazatrol programs and modify existing ones, on your computer.
- Convert between controls—Translate Mazatrol programs from one generation to another
- Mazak Communications—Send, receive, and translate between different Mazak I/O formats
- CAD/CAM for Mazatrol and G-code—draw using CAD method, or import CAD files such as DXF, IGES, etc., and output to Mazatrol programs or G-code.
