= PTC Creo Elements/Direct Drafting =

Creo Elements/Direct Drafting now owned by PTC, and formerly called ME10 is a CAD software application exclusively for 2D drawings, especially in mechanical engineering and electrical engineering.

The program was first developed by Hewlett Packard in Germany. HP released the first version 1986. Hewlett Packard MDD (Mechanical Design Division) continued the ME10 development. The first product designed using ME10 was the original HP DeskJet printer at the HP Vancouver Division.

Creo Elements/Direct Drafting was originally developed for the Hewlett-Packard 98xx workstation family (also referred to as the Series 200) on their proprietary Pascal based operating system / development environment, followed by a move a few years later to the operating system HP-UX. With the success of Microsoft Windows, a version was offered for this operating system. Some versions have also been developed for Linux. Today, MS-Windows is the standard platform for Creo Elements/Direct Drafting.

In 2010 the product was renamed to Creo Elements/Direct Drafting (as opposed to 3D product Creo Elements/Direct Modeling). Creo Elements/Direct Drafting is one of the most common 2D CAD programs for mechanical engineering in Germany, behind the leader AutoCAD.
