= I-DEAS =

Computer-aided design software

- Developer(s): Siemens Digital Industries Software
- Stable release: I-DEAS NX 12 m3
- Operating system: Unix / Windows
- Type: CAD CAE software
- Website: www.plm.automation.siemens.com/de_de/

I-DEAS (Integrated Design and Engineering Analysis Software), a computer-aided design software package. It was originally produced by SDRC in 1982. I-DEAS was used primarily in the automotive industry, most notably by Ford Motor Company (who standardized on the program) and by General Motors. SDRC was bought in 2001 by its competitor, Electronic Data Systems, which had also acquired UGS Corp. (maker of Unigraphics). EDS merged these two products into NX. UGS was purchased by Siemens AG in May 2007, and was renamed Siemens PLM Software, now known as Siemens Digital Industries Software.
