= Mastercam =

Suite of computer-aided manufacturing (CAM) software

- Developers: CNC Software, LLC
- Release: 1983
- Stable release: Mastercam 2027
- Operating system: Windows 10/11 (64-bit)
- Available in: Multilingual
- Type: Computer-aided manufacturing
- License: Proprietary commercial software
- Website: www.mastercam.com

Mastercam is a computer-aided design and manufacturing (CAD/CAM) software suite developed by CNC Software, LLC. The software runs on 64-bit Microsoft Windows and is used to generate toolpaths and numerical control (NC) code for milling, turning, mill-turn, and multiaxis machining. CNC Software and the Mastercam portfolio were acquired by industrial engineering group Sandvik in 2021.

Independent trade coverage has reported that CIMdata’s annual CAM market analysis has ranked Mastercam as the most widely used CAM package worldwide, including in 2022. First released in 1983 as a 2D CAM system with integrated CAD tools, Mastercam has since expanded to support 3D and multiaxis applications.

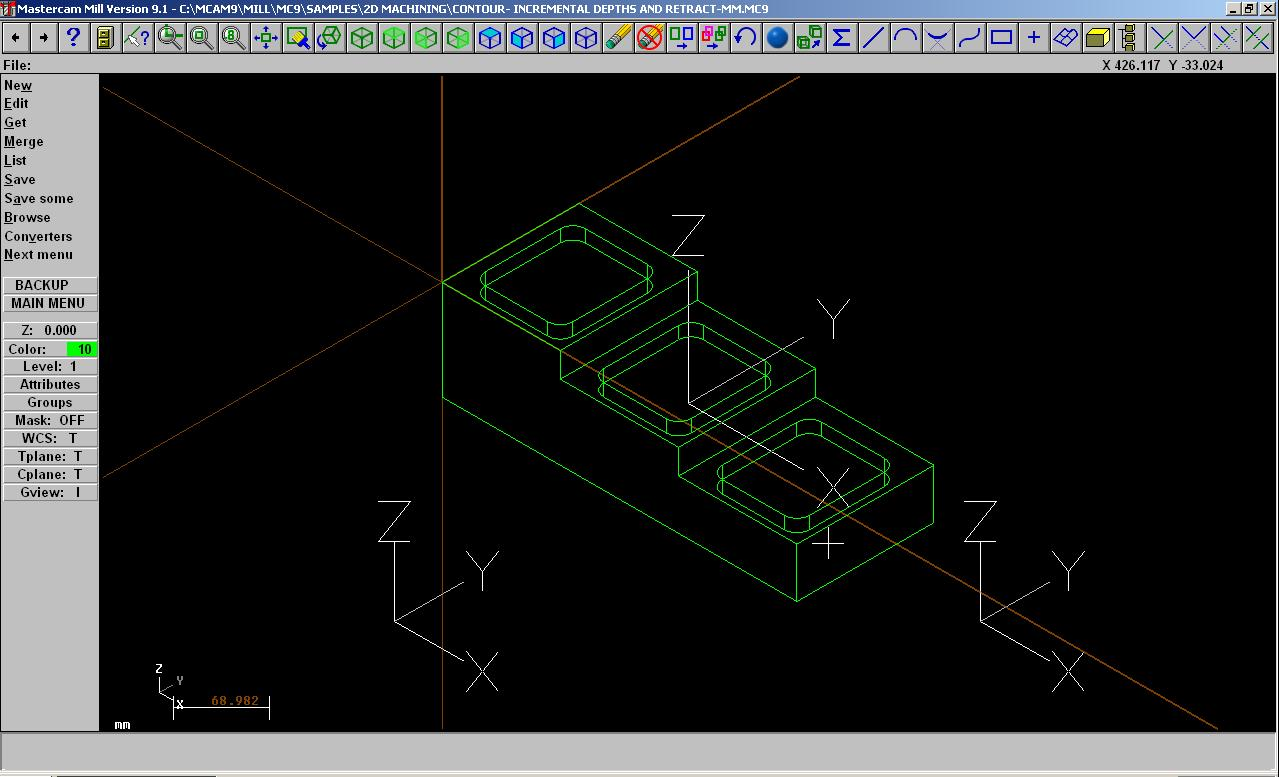
MastercamV9 mill screenshot showing an example part

== History ==
=== Founding and early development ===
CNC Software, LLC was founded in 1983 by brothers Mark and Jack Summers; their brother Brian joined later. In the same year, the company released Mastercam as a PC-based 2D CAM application with integrated CAD capabilities. Over time, the software expanded to include support for 3-axis, multiaxis, and turning operations.

=== Major milestones and product evolution ===
In 2005, CNC Software released Mastercam X, initiating the "X" series of versions. In the mid-2010s, independent sources highlighted the software’s Dynamic Motion toolpath technology, which reduces cutting paths based on material engagement to reduce cycle time and tool wear. Mastercam 2017, released in 2016, introduced a ribbon-style interface and marked a transition to year-based version naming.

Subsequent releases introduced incremental changes. Mastercam 2023, for example, included a Unified Multiaxis toolpath and added B-axis contour turning.

In January 2026, it was announced that Mastercam had acquired Advanced Mechanical Engineering AB (AME), a long-standing channel partner in Sweden and Norway. Following the acquisition, AME was integrated into Mastercam’s operations and rebranded as Mastercam Sverige, supporting the company’s move towards direct customer engagement in the Nordic region.

=== Acquisition by Sandvik ===
In August 2021, Sandvik announced an agreement to acquire CNC Software. The acquisition was completed on September 30, 2021, and Mastercam was placed within Sandvik’s Manufacturing Solutions division.

== Key functions ==
Mastercam supports the programming of CNC machines for milling, turning, mill-turn, and multiaxis operations. Its toolset includes model preparation, toolpath generation, simulation, and verification. Recent updates have introduced capabilities such as deburring and finishing toolpaths, hole-creation tools, and improved control over machining parameters.

=== Integrations, add-ons, ecosystem ===
Since the acquisition by Sandvik, several resellers and affiliated businesses have been acquired to enhance distribution and technical support. These include MCAM Northwest, ShopWare, the CAD/CAM business of OptiPro Systems, acquired in February 2025. Additional acquisitions in March 2025 included Barefoot CNC, CAD/CAM Solutions, CamTech Engineering Services, and selected CIMCO business units. CIMCO's post-processor and Probing products were later rebranded as Mastercam Probing.

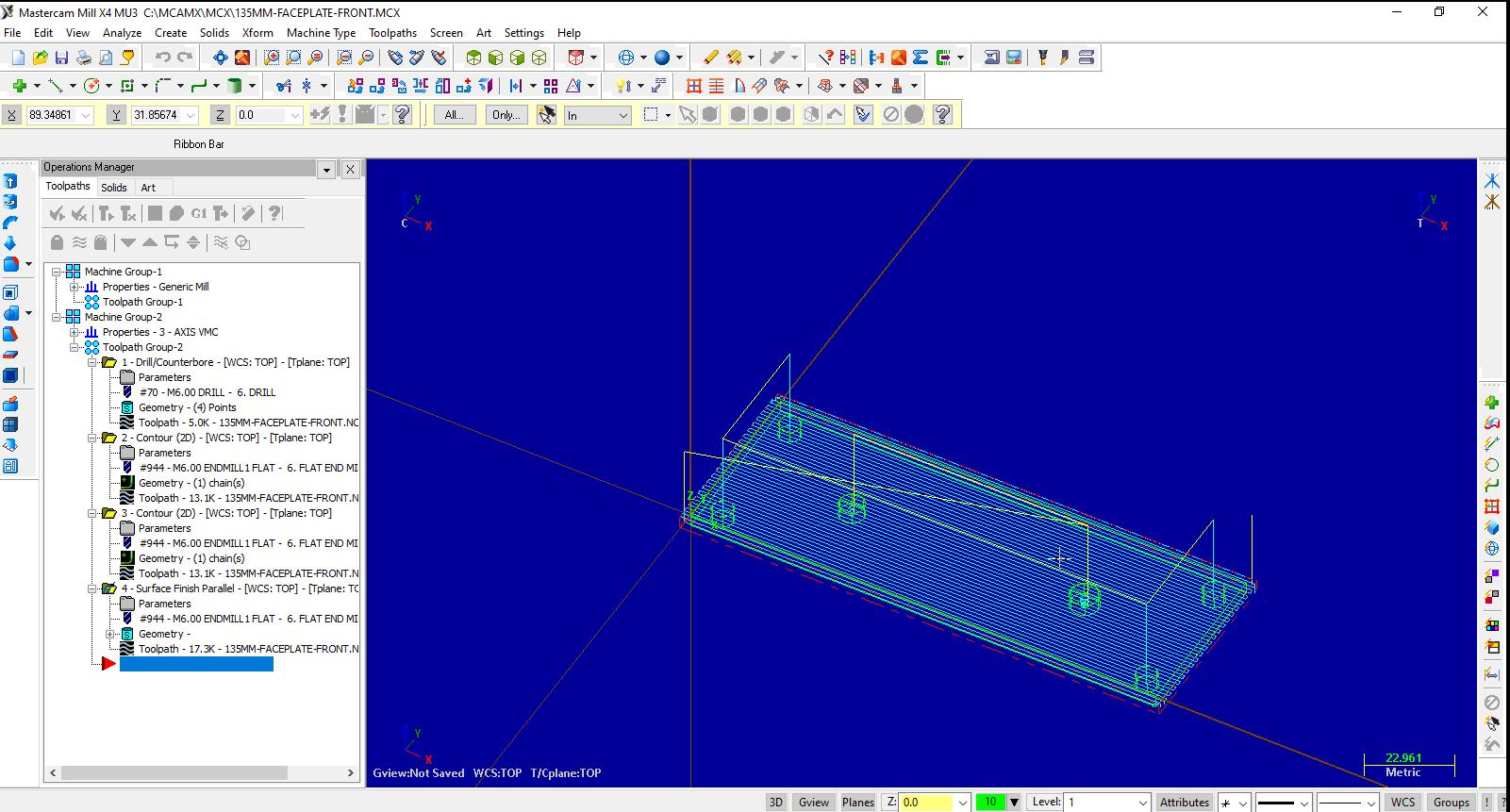
Mastercam X4 showing an example part and tool path

== Release history ==
=== Mastercam for Windows (selected releases) ===
| Year | Marketing name | Notable changes |
|---|---|---|
| 2025 | Mastercam 2026 | Improved machining capabilities; added AI assistance tools. |
| 2024 | Mastercam 2025 | Introduced a Deburr add-on for automated edge finishing; added finish passes to 2D Dynamic Mill and Area Mill. |
| 2023 | Mastercam 2024 | Interface and workflow refinements (e.g., Gview cube, setup updates). |
| 2022 | Mastercam 2023 | Unified Multiaxis toolpath; B-axis contour turning. |
| 2020 | Mastercam 2021 | Added new holemaking and multiaxis options, including Advanced Drill and Chamfer Drill (with other turning/mill-turn improvements). |
| 2019 | Mastercam 2020 | 3D Blend toolpath and improvements to Equal Scallop. |
| 2017 | Mastercam 2018 | New 2D/3D milling capabilities along with design, turning, and mill-turn updates. |
| 2016 | Mastercam 2017 | Switch from "X" series to year-based naming; ribbon-style UI. |
| 2015 | Mastercam X9 | Multiaxis updates; other design/system improvements. |
| 2011 | Mastercam X6 | Introduced a native 64-bit build. |
| 2005 | Mastercam X | Start of the "X" series. |

== Adoption and market position ==
In October 2022, Cutting Tool Engineering reported that CIMdata placed Mastercam first in both industrial and educational sectors, with over 300,000 installed seats. A similar report in November 2021 noted that Mastercam had maintained this position for 27 consecutive years and had nearly twice as many installations as the next-largest provider.

== See also ==
- Multiaxis machining
- G-code
- APT
- List of computer-aided manufacturing software
