= Product data management =

Use of tools to track data related to a product

Product data management (PDM) is the name of a business function within product lifecycle management (PLM) that denotes the management and publication of product data. In software engineering, this is known as version control. In the context of PDM, version control keeps track of all the different file versions (e.g. CAD, spreadsheets, written documents) and who was responsible for the changes in those files. The goals of product data management include ensuring all stakeholders share a common understanding, that confusion during the execution of the processes is minimized, and that the highest standards of quality controls are maintained. PDM should not be confused with product information management (PIM).

== Introduction ==
Product data management is the use of software or other tools to track and control data related to a particular product. The data tracked usually involves the technical specifications of the product, specifications for manufacture and development, and the types of materials that will be required to produce goods. The use of product data management allows a company to track the various costs associated with the creation and launch of a product. Product data management is part of product lifecycle management and configuration management, and is primarily used by engineers.

Within PDM the focus is on managing and tracking the creation, change, and archive of all information related to a product. The information being stored and managed (on one or more file servers) will include engineering data such as computer-aided design (CAD) models, drawings, and their associated documents.

Product data management (PDM) serves as a central knowledge repository for process and product history and promotes integration and data exchange among all business users who interact with products — including project managers, engineers, salespeople, buyers, and quality assurance teams.

The central database will also manage metadata such as the owner of a file and the release status of the components. The package will control check-in and check-out of the product data to multi-user; carry out engineering change management and release control on all versions/issues of components in a product; build and manipulate the product structure bill of materials (BOM) for assemblies; and assist in configurations management of product variants.

This enables automatic reports on product costs, etc. Furthermore, PDM enables companies producing complex products to spread product data into the entire PLM launch process. This significantly enhances the effectiveness of the launch process.

Product data management is focused on capturing and maintaining information on products and/or services through their development and useful life. Typical information managed within the PDM module includes:

- Brand name
- Part number
- Part description
- Supplier/vendor
- Vendor part number and description
- Unit of measure
- Cost/price
- Schematic or CAD drawing
- Material data-sheets

== Advantages ==
- Track and manage all changes to product-related data
- Spend less time organizing and tracking design data
- Improve productivity through reuse of product design data
- Enhance collaboration
- Helps using visual management

== Industrial Applications ==
Product Data Management is closely related and often used interchangeably with Product Information Management (PIM). PDM software applications are commonly used by companies involved in manufacturing and retailing.

== History ==
PDM stems from traditional engineering design activities that created product drawings and schematics on paper and using CAD tools to create parts lists (Bills of Material structures – BOM). The PDM and BOM data are used in enterprise resource planning (ERP) systems to plan and coordinate all transactional operations of a company (sales order management, purchasing, cost accounting, logistics, etc.)

PDM is a subset of a larger concept of product lifecycle management (PLM). PLM encompasses the processes needed to launch new products (NPI), manage changes to existing products (ECN/ECO) and retire products at the end of their life span (EoL).

Early Product data management software was developed and used internally at some organizations, such as NASA and Boeing's IPAD or Ford Motor Company's PDGS. The first Product data management software on the open market was Sherpaworks by Sherpa, released in 1984. More software followed in the 1990s, when the market expanded.
