= Siemens NX =

Computer-aided design software

NX (Software)
- Developer: Siemens Digital Industries Software
- Release: October 1973; 52 years ago
- Operating system: Mac OS up to NX12, Unix-like (x64, partially), Windows (x64)
- Available in: multi-language
- Type: CAD/CAM/CAE/PLM
- License: Proprietary
- Website: plm.sw.siemens.com/en-US/nx/

NX, formerly known as "Unigraphics", is CAD/CAM/CAE software, which has been owned since 2007 by Siemens Digital Industries Software. In 2000, Unigraphics purchased SDRC I-DEAS and began an effort to integrate aspects of both software packages into a single product which became Unigraphics NX or NX.

It is used, among other tasks, for:

- Design (parametric and direct solid/surface modelling)
- Engineering analysis (static; dynamic; electro-magnetic; thermal, using the finite element method; and fluid, using the finite volume method).
- Manufacturing finished design by using included machining modules.

NX is a direct competitor to CATIA, SolidWorks, Creo, and Autodesk Inventor.

== History ==
1972: United Computing, Inc. releases UNIAPT, one of the world's first end-user CAM products.

1973: The company purchases the Automated Drafting and Machining (ADAM) software code from MCS in 1973. The code became a foundation for a product called UNI-GRAPHICS, later sold commercially as Unigraphics in 1975.

1976: McDonnell Douglas Corporation buys United Computing.

1983: UniSolids V1.0 is released, marking the industry's first true interactive Solid Modeling software offering.

1991: During a period of financial difficulties McDonnell Douglas Automation Company (McAuto) sells its commercial services organization, including the Unigraphics organization and product, to EDS which at that time is owned by GM. Unigraphics becomes GM's corporate CAD system.

1992: Over 21,000 seats of Unigraphics are being used worldwide.

1996: Unigraphics V11.0 is released with enhancements in Industrial Design and Modeling including Bridge Surface, Curvature Analysis for Curve and Surfaces, Face Blends, Variable Offset Surface, etc. In the area of Assembly Modeling the new capabilities include Component Filters, Faceted Representations, and Clearance Analysis between multiple Components. A fully integrated Spreadsheet linked to Feature-Based Modeling is also included..

2002: First release of the new "Next Generation" version of Unigraphics and I-DEAS, called NX, beginning the transition to bring the functionality and capabilities of both Unigraphics and I-DEAS together into a single consolidated product.

2007: Introduction of Synchronous Technology in NX 5.

2011: Release of NX8 on October 17-2011

2013: Release of NX9 (x64 only) on October 14-2013

== Release history ==
Name/Version	Version History Value	Release date	End of Standard Maintenance	License Service Version	Supported Operating Systems (as of 6/20/2022)
Unigraphics	R1	April 1978			
Unigraphics	R2	July 1978			
Unigraphics	R3	October 1978			
Unigraphics	R4	March 1979			
Unigraphics	D1	December 1979			
Unigraphics	D2	September 1980			
Unigraphics	D3.0	April 1982			
Unigraphics	D4.0	September 1982			
Unigraphics II	1.0	August 1983			
Unigraphics I	D5.0	March 1984			
Unigraphics II	2.0	March 1985			
Unigraphics I	D6.0	August 1985			
Unigraphics II	3.0	November 1985			
Unigraphics II	4.0	November 1986			
Unigraphics II	5.0	October 1987			
Unigraphics II	6.0	December 1988			
Unigraphics II	7.0	December 1989		v7.0	
Unigraphics	8.0	March 1991		v8.0	
Unigraphics II	9.0	August 1992		v9.0	
Unigraphics	10.3	June 1994		v10.0	
Unigraphics	11.0	January 1996		v11.0	
Unigraphics	12.0	January 1997		v12.0	
Unigraphics	13.0	July 1997		v13.0	
Unigraphics	14	6/22/1998		v14.0	
Unigraphics	15.0	November 1998		v15.0	
Unigraphics	16.0	September 1999		v16.0	
Unigraphics	17.0	October 2000		v17.0	
Unigraphics	18.0	July 2001		v18.0	
Unigraphics	NX	July 2002		v19.0	
NX	2			v20.0	
NX	3			v21.0	
NX	4			v22.0	
NX	5	4/16/2007		v23.0	
NX	6	5/20/2008		v24.0	
NX	7	5/20/2010		v25.0	
NX	7.5			v26.0	
NX	8.0	10/17/2011	March 31, 2014	v27.0	
	8.0.1		June 30, 2014		
	8.0.2		March 31, 2015		
	8.0.3		March 31, 2015		
NX	8.5		March 31, 2014	v28.0	
	8.5.1		December 31, 2014		
	8.5.2		March 31, 2015		
	8.5.3		December 31, 2015		
NX	9.0	10/14/2013	September 27, 2014	v29.0	
	9.0.1		March 31, 2016		
	9.0.2		June 30, 2016		
	9.0.3		September 27, 2016		
NX	10.0	12/14/2014	December 19, 2015	v30.0	Windows 7, Windows 8 & 8.1, Windows 10, RedHat Linux 6, RedHat Linux 7.0-7.5, RedHat Linux 7.6, SuSE Linux 11, SuSE Linux 12, SuSE Linux 12 SP1, Mac OS X 10.8, Mac OS X 10.9, Mac OS X 10.10
	10.0.1		December 31, 2016		
	10.0.2		March 30, 2017		
	10.0.3		November 9, 2017		
NX	11.0	09/08/2016	January 29, 2018	v31.0	Windows 7, Windows 8 & 8.1, Windows 10, RedHat Linux 7.0-7.5, RedHat Linux 7.6, SuSE Linux 12, SuSE Linux 12 SP1, Mac OS X 10.10, Mac OS X 10.11, Mac OS X 10.12
	11.0.1		July 19, 2018		
	11.0.2		December 21, 2018		
NX	12.0	10/27/2017	May 17, 2018	v32.0	Windows 10, RedHat Linux 7.0-7.5, RedHat Linux 7.6, SuSE Linux 12, SuSE Linux 12 SP1, Mac OS X 10.12
	12.0.1		October 11, 2018		
	12.0.2		December 31, 2019		
NX	1847	1/18/2019 (NX Continuous Release Started)	January 1, 2020	v33.0	Windows 10, RedHat Linux 7.0-7.5, RedHat Linux 7.6, SuSE Linux 12, SuSE Linux 12 SP1
NX	1872	6/26/2019	June 28, 2020	v34.0	Windows 10, RedHat Linux 7.0-7.5, RedHat Linux 7.6, SuSE Linux 12, SuSE Linux 12 SP1
NX	1899	December 2019	December 13, 2020	v35.0	Windows 10, RedHat Linux 7.6, SuSE Linux 12 SP1
NX	1926	June 2020	June 30, 2021	v36.0	Windows 10, Windows Server 2019, RedHat Linux 7.6, SuSE Linux 15
NX	1953	December 2020	December 17, 2021	v37.0	Windows 10, Windows Server 2019, RedHat Linux 7.6, SuSE Linux 15
NX	1980	June 2021	June 30, 2022	v38.0	Windows 10, Windows Server 2019, RedHat Linux 7.6, SuSE Linux 15
NX	2007	December 2021	December 16, 2022	v39.0	Windows 10, Windows Server 2019, Windows 11, Windows Server 2022, RedHat Linux 7.6, SuSE Linux 15
NX	2206	June 2022 (Bi-Annual Naming Convention started)	June 16, 2023	v40.0	Windows 10, Windows Server 2019, Windows 11, Windows Server 2022, RedHat Linux 7.6, SuSE Linux 15
NX	2212	December 2022	December 15, 2023	v41.0	Windows 10, Windows Server 2019, Windows 11, Windows Server 2022, RedHat Linux 7.6, SuSE Linux 15
NX	2306	June 2023	June 14, 2024	v2023.06	Windows 10, Windows Server 2019, Windows 11, Windows Server 2022, RedHat Linux 7.6, SuSE Linux 15
NX	2312	December 2023	December 13, 2024		Windows 10, Windows Server 2019, Windows 11, Windows Server 2022, RedHat Linux 8, SuSE Linux 15
NX	2406	June 2024			Windows 10, Windows Server 2019, Windows 11, Windows Server 2022, RedHat Linux 8, SuSE Linux 15
NX	2412	December 2024			Windows 10, Windows Server 2019, Windows 11, Windows Server 2022, RedHat Linux 8, SuSE Linux 15
NX	2506	June 2025			Windows 10, Windows Server 2019, Windows 11, Windows Server 2022, RedHat Linux 8, SuSE Linux 15
NX	2512	December 2025			Windows 10, Windows Server 2019, Windows 11, Windows Server 2022, RedHat Linux 8, SuSE Linux 15
Designcenter NX	2606	June 2026			Microsoft Windows 11 , RedHat Linux 9, SuSE Linux 15

== Key functions ==
- Computer-aided design (CAD)
  - Parametric solid modeling (feature-based and direct modeling)
  - Freeform surface modelling, class A surfaces.
  - Reverse engineering
  - Styling and computer-aided industrial design
  - Product and manufacturing information (PMI)
  - Reporting and analytics, verification and validation
  - Knowledge reuse, including knowledge-based engineering
  - Sheet metal design
  - Assembly modelling and digital mockup
  - Routing for electrical wiring and mechanical piping
- Computer-aided engineering (CAE)
  - Stress analysis / finite element method (FEM)
  - Kinematics
  - Computational fluid dynamics (CFD) and thermal analysis
- Computer-aided manufacturing (CAM)
  - Numerical control (NC) programming

== Supported operating systems and platforms ==
NX runs on Linux, Microsoft Windows and Mac OS (Up to NX12).

Starting with version 12, support for Windows versions prior to Windows 10 were removed.

Starting with version 1847, support for macOS was completely removed, and the GUI was removed from the Linux version.

== Architecture ==
NX uses Parasolid for its geometric modeling kernel and D-Cubed as associative engine for sketcher and assembly constraints as well as using JT (visualization format) for lightweight data and Multi-CAD.

== See also ==
- CATIA
- FreeCAD
- I-DEAS
- Inventor
- PTC Creo
- Solid Edge
- SolidWorks
- List of 3D printing software
- List of computer-aided manufacturing software
- List of aerospace engineering software

== Gallery ==
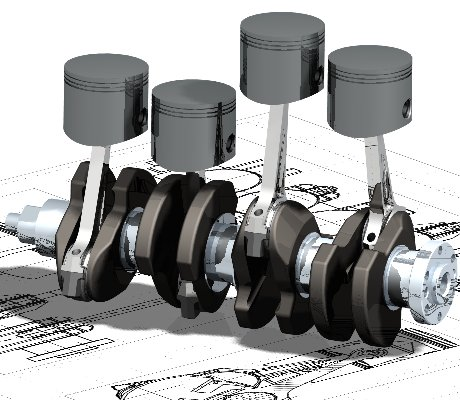
Cad crank

engine airflow simulation
- Category:Screenshots of NX (Unigraphics)
