= Autodesk Inventor =

3D mechanical CAD design software

- Original author: Peter "de vlieg" stinissen
- Developer: Autodesk
- Release: 1999; 27 years ago
- Stable release: 2027 / March 25, 2026; 5 months ago
- Operating system: Windows
- Type: Computer-aided design
- License: Proprietary
- Website: www.autodesk.com/products/inventor/overview

Autodesk Inventor is a computer-aided design extension application for 3D mechanical design, simulation, visualization, and documentation developed by Autodesk.

== Features ==
Inventor allows analyzing 2D and 3D CAD models by creating a virtual representation of the final product in order to validate the form, fit, and functioning before it is built.

Autodesk Inventor supports parametric, direct edit, freeform modeling part modeling, and assembly modeling. It provides support for various CAD formats and standard DWG drawings. Autodesk also offers another 3D CAD/CAM software, Fusion.

Inventor uses ShapeManager, Autodesk's proprietary geometric modeling kernel.

The software can be licensed as a subscription or through pre-paid Flex Tokens (daily use, consumption-based). Autodesk Inventor Professional is also a part of a collection license Autodesk Product Design & Manufacturing Collection. Autodesk Inventor competes directly with SolidWorks, Solid Edge, and Creo.

== Editions ==
The latest Autodesk Inventor product line includes the following software titles:

- Autodesk Inventor LT 2021 (discontinued)
- Autodesk Inventor Professional 2026

== File formats ==
- Exports:
  - .iam - Assembly file
  - .ipt - Part file
  - .idw, .dwg - Drawing file
  - .ipn - Presentation file
- Imports:
  - Inventor imports most types of foreign CAD formats

== Release dates and names ==
Version	Internal number	Code name	Date of release	What's New
1	1	Mustang	September 20, 1999	
2	2	Thunderbird	March 1, 2000	
3	3	Camaro	August 1, 2000	
4	4	Corvette	December 1, 2000	
5	5	Durango	September 17, 2001	
5.3	5.3	Prowler	January 30, 2002	
6	6	Viper	October 15, 2002	
7	7	Wrangler	April 18, 2003	New DWG Support for AutoCAD 2004, Autodesk Express Viewer Compatibility, Large-Assembly Design Performance
8	8	Cherokee	October 15, 2003	
9	9	Crossfire	July 15, 2004	
10	10	Freestyle	April 6, 2005	Task Scheduler, Inventor Studio, Associative import of Mechanical Desktop data, Design Accelerators, Assembly constraints use colors to differentiate between the first and second constraint selection.
11	11	Faraday	April 6, 2006	
2008	12	Goddard	April 11, 2007	
2009	13	Tesla	April 16, 2008	Frame Generator, Sheet Metal, skeletal modelling
2010	14	Hopper	February 27, 2009	The Ribbon, New FEA
2011	15	Sikorsky	March 26, 2010	Dynamic Input, Direct Manipulation, Assemble tool, Visualization, iCopy, iLogic
2012	16	Brunel	March 22, 2011	Provides easier ways to interact with 3D mechanical design data; new opportunities for sharing, accepting and updating CAD data regardless of source and complexity; and high-impact performance and productivity improvements for both users and IT departments
2013	17	Goodyear	March 27, 2012	Equation curves
2014	18	Franklin	March 27, 2013	Express mode, Connection, Symmetrical constraint, Slot geometry, Enhanced rectangle geometry, Thin wall FEA, Frame FEA, Assembly relationship folder Mouseover grounded constraint visibility, Model & assembly simplification, Joint constraints.
2015	19	Dyson	March 28, 2014	Freeform, Direct Edit
2016	20	Shelby	April 16, 2015	Multi-CAD, AutoCAD Electrical and Inventor Interoperability, Multi-thread support, Shape Generator, 3D Printing Environment, Graphics/Visualization/Studio Enhancements
2017	21	Enzo	March 28, 2016	Modeling enhancements, expanded AnyCAD support, 3D PDF export, enhanced presentation environment, guided tutorial authoring
2018	22	Elon	March 24, 2017	Model Based Definition, expanded AnyCAD support, large assembly performance improvements, simplification/shrinkwrap enhancements, multiple rules for sheet metal parts, mesh support in drawing views
2019	23	Zora	April 10, 2018	Performance improvements, large assembly performance improvements, shared view collaboration, expanded hole command, iLogic enhancements, model-based definition, improved part modeling workflows, and sheet metal for manufacturing
2020	24	Senna	March 27, 2019	Overall GUI improvements
2021	25	Ada	March 31, 2020	New UI Panel, Large Assembly Performance Improvement, Modeling enhancements
2022	26	Ren	April 4, 2021	Model States, Performance, Revit and Fusion 360 interop
2023	27		March 28, 2022	Autodesk Inventor 2023 is packed with customer-driven updates and enhancements to help you speed up your design workflows, reduce repetitive tasks, and improve experiences so you can focus more time on design and innovation.
2024	28		March 29, 2023	
2025	29		March 27, 2024	Updates to part modeling, sheet metal, assembly modeling, drawings, and interoperability.
2026	30		March 26, 2025	Updates to performance, part modeling, sheet metal, assembly mirroring, drawings, and interoperability.

== See also ==
- Comparison of computer-aided design software
- PTC Creo
- Solid Edge
- SolidWorks
