= SolidWorks =

Desktop software for 3D modeling

SOLIDWORKS

- SolidWorks 2023 displaying a 3D assembly.
- Developer: Dassault Systèmes
- Release: November 1, 1995; 31 years ago
- Stable release: SolidWorks 2026 / November 14, 2025
- Operating system: Microsoft Windows
- Available in: Chinese, Chinese Simplified, Czech, English, French, German, Italian, Japanese, Korean, Polish, Portuguese, Russian, Spanish, Turkish
- Type: CAD CAE PDM PLM
- License: Proprietary, term
- Website: solidworks.com

SolidWorks (stylized as SOLIDWORKS, officially rebranded as SOLIDWORKS Design in 2026) is a brand of software used for solid modeling computer-aided design (CAD) and computer-aided engineering (CAE). It was one of the first 3D CAD applications designed to run on a desktop PC.

The brand is owned by French software company Dassault Systèmes.

== Company overview ==
Manish Kumar is CEO of SolidWorks, as of 2025.

SolidWorks, originally a privately held company, was acquired by Dassault Systèmes in 1997 through a stock transaction valued at $300 million. Prior to the acquisition, it was named Solidworks Corporation.

As of 2024, SolidWorks had an estimated 7.5 million users.

== History ==
SolidWorks Corporation was established in December 1993 by MIT graduate Jon Hirschtick. During this time, computer-aided design software was only compatible with UNIX systems. Hirschtick aimed to create a software that was easy to use and affordable and so created SolidWorks for Microsoft Windows.

SolidWorks was originally based in Concord, Massachusetts with Hirschtick as its first chief executive officer. Its first product, SolidWorks 95, was released in November 1995 after two years of development. The next year, John McEleney succeeded Hirschtick as CEO. In 1997, Dassault Systèmes acquired SolidWorks for $316 million.

Under McEleney, SolidWorks increased its number of customers to over 40,000 and had a market valuation of $1.5 billion. After 12 years as CEO, McEleney stepped down and was succeeded by Jeff Ray.

In 2011, Dassault Systèmes purchased a new office in Waltham, Massachusetts, where SolidWorks became headquartered.

By 2013, SolidWorks was used by 62 percent of engineering professionals.

Gian Paolo Bassi was named CEO in 2015. During his tenure, he was credited with modernizing SolidWorks by adding cloud features, utilizing databases in the software over files, and pushing for environmental initiatives. Bassi stepped down in 2022 and was succeeded by Manish Kumar, SolidWork's vice president of research and development.

=== Korea ===
Dassault Systèmes Korea previously maintained territorial exclusivity for its dealers, but it was discontinued after regulatory sanctions. Following the discontinuation of territorial exclusivity, eight SolidWorks dealers NodeData, Maven, Solco, Webs System Korea, Wivermansi, K&Solution, Hanyoung Solutec, and Prism conspired and colluded on customer allocation and pricing causing SolidWorks pricing to increase by over 50% from August 2021 to July 2024. These companies have set a price floor on SolidWorks and restricted dealers from soliciting other dealers existing customers.

== Modeling technology ==
Screenshot captured from a SolidWorks top-down design approach

SolidWorks is a mechanical CAD software that uses a parametric feature-based approach. It offers cloud-based tools through the 3DExperience platform connection for design, simulation, and data management. The software includes tools for analyses and simulations, such as Finite Element Analysis, which supports modeling, design, and collaborative work. There are multiple work tools for use when building system assemblies such as the interference detection tool. This enables the detection of potential interfering parts which could cause issues in the assembly system.

In 2019, a 3DExperience platform was created for the desktop based tools. In 2025, Dassault Systèmes launched virtual assistants connected to SolidWorks through the 3DExperience platform.

== See also ==
- Comparison of computer-aided design software
- List of 3D printing software
- Power Surfacing – allows users to create and edit complex freeform surfaces in SolidWorks
