= GstarCAD =

Computer aided design software

- Developer(s): Suzhou Gstarsoft Co., Ltd
- Initial release: 2003
- Stable release: GstarCAD 2025 PRO/STD/LT
- Operating system: Windows, Linux
- Type: CAD
- License: Proprietary software
- Website: gstarcad.net

GstarCAD is a CAD (Computer Aided Design or Computer Aided Drafting) software platform, using the Open Design Alliance DWG libraries to read and write the DWG file format made popular by the AutoCAD CAD package.

GstarCAD is a capable alternative to other well-known CAD packages on the market, and provides OpenDWG file compatibility, as well as an interface which is very similar to that of AutoCAD.

There software comes in "professional", "standard", "LT" and "academic" versions.

It available in English, Spanish, German, French, Chinese Simplified, Chinese Traditional, Czech, Italian, Japanese, Korean, Polish, Russian, Hungarian, French, etc.

Apart from DWG support, files can be exported to DXF. Gstarsoft has also released versions for mobile devices called GstarCAD MC which runs on iOS and Android. GstarCAD's GRX API means that software written for AutoCADs ARX API can run on both without changes to the code.
