= LibreCAD =

Free and open-source 2D CAD software

- LibreCAD icon

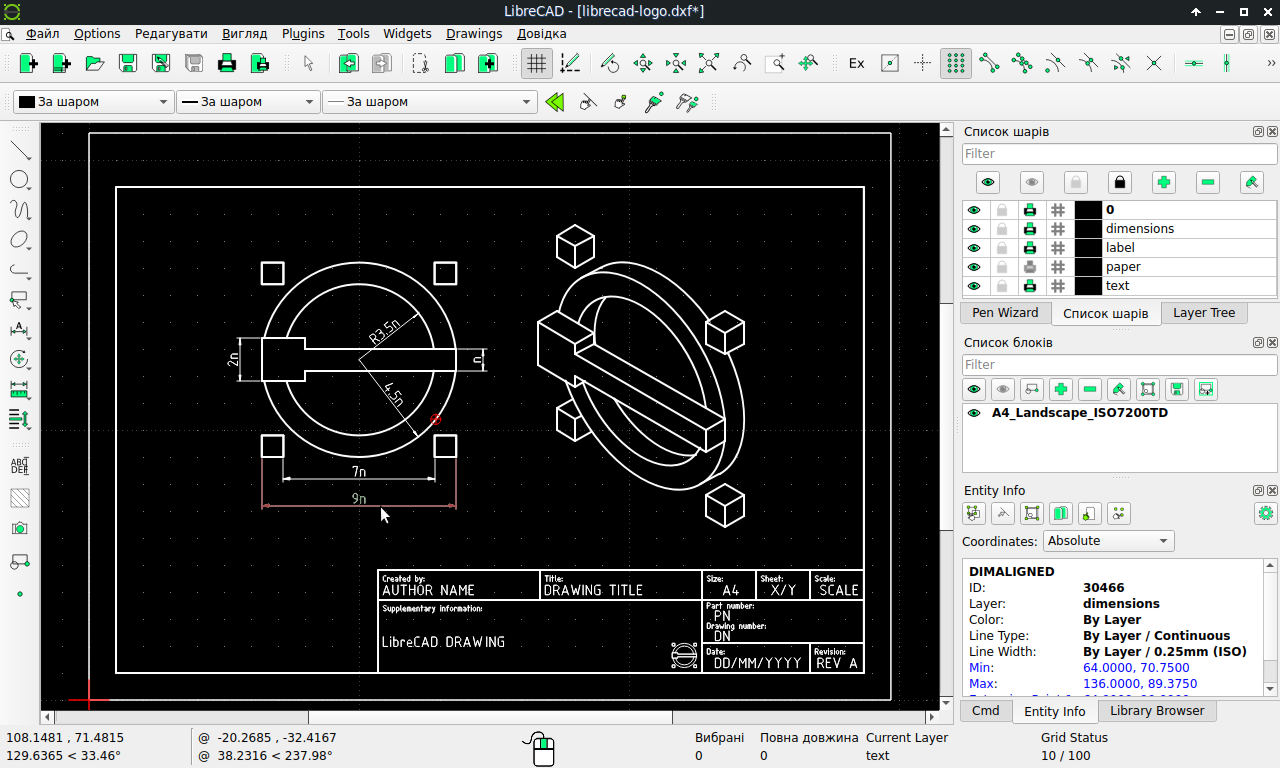
- LibreCAD 2.2.2 screenshot
- Other names: CADuntu
- Original author: Ries van Twisk
- Developers: Armin Stebich, Dongxu Li, Rallaz, Ravas and others
- Release: December 15, 2011; 14 years ago
- Stable release: 2.2.1.4 / 3 March 2026
- Preview release: 2.2.2_alpha
- Written in: C, C++, Lua
- Operating system: Windows, macOS, Unix-like, Linux, Haiku
- Platform: x86-64
- Included with: CAELinux; UALinux: Ubuntu Education Pack
- Predecessor: QCAD CE 2.0.5
- Size: 40 MB
- Standards: ANSI/ACME, ISO 3098, ISO 7200
- Available in: 64 languages
- Type: Computer-aided design
- License: GPL-2.0-only
- Website: librecad.org
- Repository: LibreCAD on GitHub

LibreCAD is a computer-aided design (CAD) application for 2D design. It is free and open-source, and available for Unix/Linux, macOS, and Microsoft Windows operating systems.

Most of the interface and handle concepts are analogous to AutoCAD, making it easier to use for users with experience in this type of commercial CAD application.

== History ==
Around 2010, the QCAD Community Edition 2.0.5 was forked to start the development of what is now known as LibreCAD. Originally, the GUI was based on Qt3 libraries.

=== CADuntu ===
CADuntu — was the initial QCAD CE fork project name. It was used for a short time and, after discussion with users, has been replaced by LibreCAD, as to not be associated with Ubuntu and Canonical Ltd.

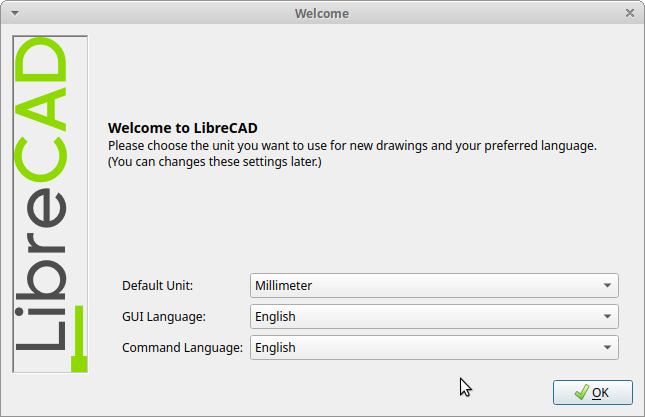
LibreCAD Welcome screen

=== LibreCAD 1 ===
The main feature of LibreCAD 1 was porting of its graphical user interface (GUI) code to Qt4, so it can run identically on several platforms.

=== LibreCAD 2 ===
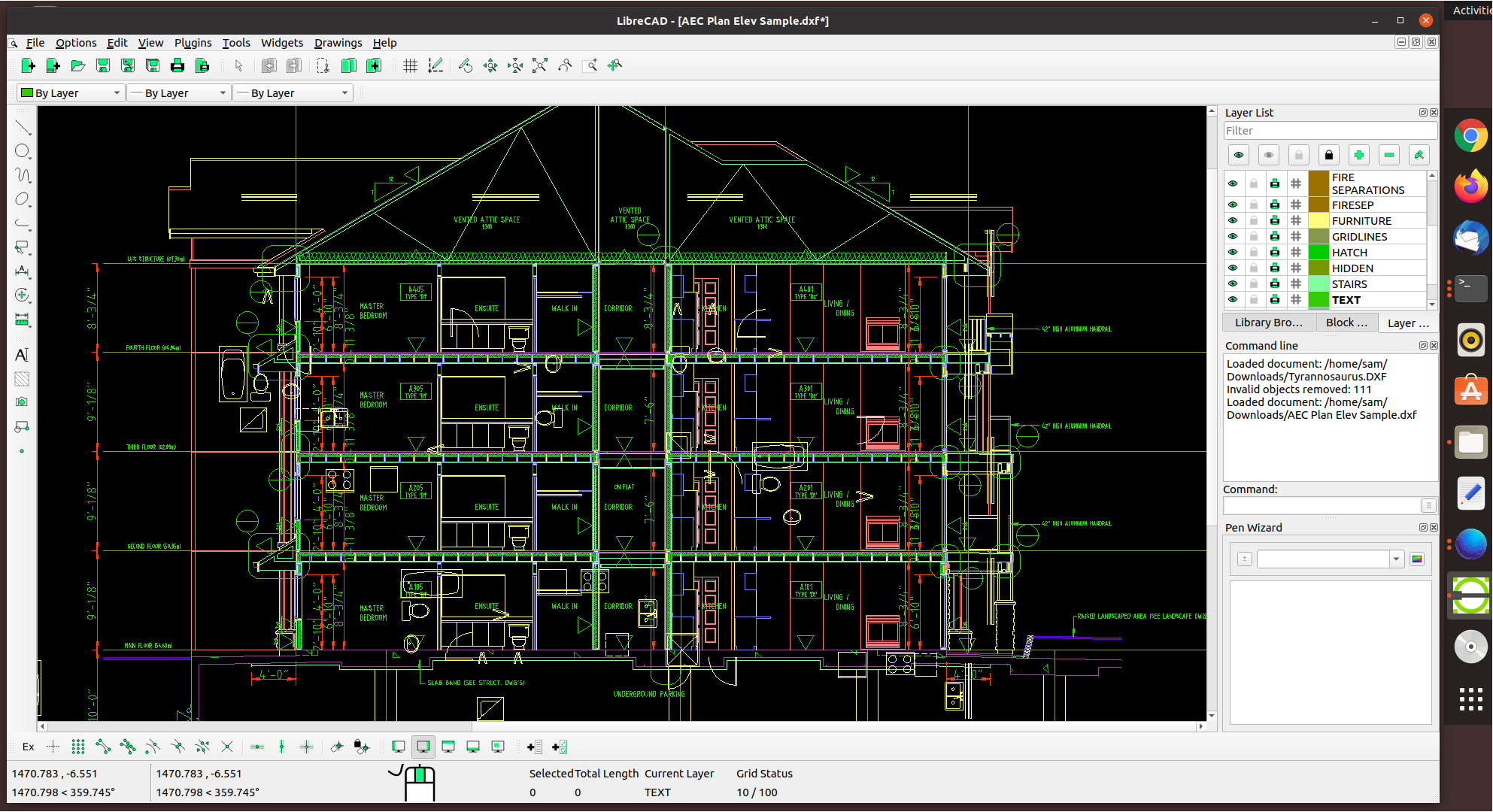
LibreCAD 2 with AEC drawing

LibreCAD 2 implements Qt5 and Qt6 library support.

As of 2024, LibreCAD development split into two branches:

- 2.2.1.x — actual release with bug-fix updates;
- 2.2.2_alpha — alpha version of the future release, with many new experimental feature, not for regular use yet.

=== LibreCAD 3 ===
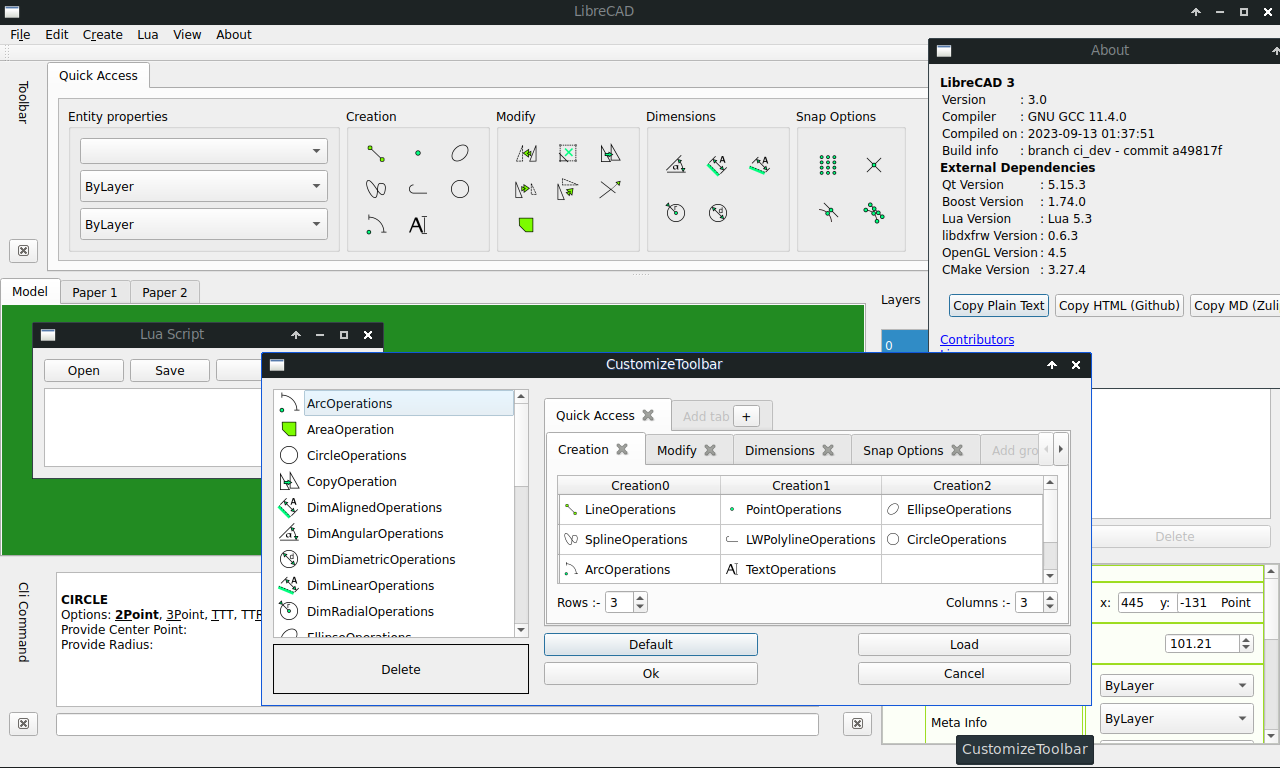
LibreCAD 3 test build screen

LibreCAD 3 — is an experimental fully rewritten from scratch LibreCAD version, designed to be GPLv3 compatible with LibreDWG, with Lua-scripting, ribbon UI.

Development mostly done during 2018–2023 GSoC sessions, in the collaboration with BRL-CAD team.

Latest commits and test builds built in September 2023, and since development stalled. LibreCAD team has actually frozen this project, and are focusing on LibreCAD 2 and libdxfrw library development.

== Version history ==
Version history data are taken from official Web site, project pages on Sourceforge and GitHub.

== Features ==
LibreCAD is available in over 60 languages.

It uses the AutoCAD DXF file format internally for import and save files, as well as allowing export to many other file formats.

=== File formats ===
As of version 2.2.0, LibreCAD is capable of reading and writing the following file formats:

Open File or Import Block

- CAD: DXF, DWG, JWW, Shapefile (deprecated)
- CAD font: LFF, CXF

Import Image

- Vector image: SVG, SVGZ
- Bitmap image: BMP, CUR, GIF, ICNS, ICO, JPEG, JPG, PBM, PGM, PNG, PPM, TGA, TIF, TIFF, WBMP, WebP, XBM, XPM

Save File

- CAD: DXF (2007), DXF (2004), DXF (2000), DXF (R14), DXF (R12)
- CAD font: LFF, CXF

Export

- PDF (or sent drawing to printer for direct print)
- Vector image: SVG, CAM (Plain SVG)
- Bitmap image: BMP, CUR, ICNS, ICO, JPG, PBM, PGM, PNG, PPM, TIF, WBMP, WEBP, XBM, XPM

==== libdxfrw ====
As the GNU LibreDWG library is released under GPLv3, it cannot be used by GPLv2-licensed LibreCAD and FreeCAD, because their licenses are incompatible. A request also went to the FSF to relicense GNU LibreDWG as GPLv2, which was rejected. The problem was eventually resolved by writing a new GPLv2-licensed library called libdxfrw, with more complete DWG support, which is now also used in other software. e.g., in SolveSpace, that is also uses LibreCAD's unicode.lff font as built-in default font for UI and dimension labels).

==== LFF (LibreCAD Font Format) ====
Due to copyright issues with QCAD CE's fonts in CXF format, initially used in LibreCAD, it was decided to create own font format.

LibreCAD Font Format — is a plain text file format (with *.lff file extension) for single stroke vector fonts.

There is a way to edit LFF fonts directly in LibreCAD or create fonts from fonts in other formats. Converters to LFF format are designed for the next formats:

- TTF (TrueType fonts) — converter available online on official site and as a CLI utility;
- JHF (Hershey fonts) — converter implemented as CLI utility;
- Shx (Shapefile Index fonts) — converter designed by 3rd party developer.

LibreCAD Font Format adopted in SolveSpace CAD, and LibrePCB software designed FontoBene (*.bene) font format for PCB, which is derived from LFF.

== Usage ==
LibreCAD is in use in many countries for educational purposes at schools and universities, in production at firms and factories for design and manufacturing various items, architecture design, garden and landscape design, etc.

Due to free licensing, in some countries LibreCAD is used for decreasing budget expenses on software licensing by replacing commercial CAD at state and governmental organizations, public schools, etc. Also, LibreCAD is chosen in cases where there are no reachable official dealers of commercial software, or all available commercial CAD solutions are too expensive.

In some countries LibreCAD is used to circumvent international sanctions; for example, in Russia it has been used in light of international sanctions implemented in response to the invasion of Ukraine.

LibreCAD has been included into CAELinux distribution, targeting engineers and makers.

=== European Union ===
In 2011, for the e-LIFE education project, organized by European Commission for disabled people, a manual was provided with few chapters on learning LibreCAD and other free CAD programs, which has been translated into Greek, Spanish, Slovak, Turkish and Romanian.

=== Ukraine ===
Since 1990s, most of the Ukrainian schools, universities and factories have used licensed Russian CAD KOMPAS, that is designed for GOST standards, but after the beginning of the Russo-Ukrainian War since 2014, and after sanctions on Russian software has been implemented by the President of Ukraine in 2017, Ukrainian users are switching from KOMPAS to other CAD software, including LibreCAD.

During 2016–2019, in Ukraine there was reviewed and declined use of GOST standards, that is the base of the Unified System for Design Documentation, and since then most of GOST standards was replaced by State Standards of Ukraine and by adopted ISO standards, which LibreCAD is adapted for.

At educational institutions of Ukraine LibreCAD often used in such courses like geometry, descriptive geometry, technical drawing, graphic design, engineering graphics, informatics, mechanics, analytical mechanics, design and technology, materials science, woodworking, metalworking, automation, etc.

Since 2019, LibreCAD is included in the list of permitted software to install on computers at departments of the State Emergency Service of Ukraine as the only CAD software permitted to use, according to SESU Head's Order No.425 (Appendix 1, p. 2), signed on 19 July 2019.

Ukrainian scientists, researchers, design bureaus, freelancers, and single and small manufactures use LibreCAD.

LibreCAD has been included into educational edition of the Ukrainian Linux distribution for schools UALinux: Ubuntu Education Pack.

=== United States ===
In 2021, LibreCAD has been used for student research works challenge CELERE (Capillary Effects on Liquids Exploratory Research Experiments) organized by NASA for the collecting and choosing experiments on research into capillary action to be tested in low gravity conditions on ISS. For the participants a user handbook on LibreCAD was created and provided by employees of NASA Glenn Research Center.

== See also ==
- Comparison of computer-aided design software
- BRL-CAD (LibreCAD project partner)
- CAD Assistant (freeware CAD viewer)
- GDAL (open-source GIS and CAD file format converter)
- ODA Converter (freeware DXF/DWG version converter)
- VariCAD Viewer (freeware CAD viewer)
- FreeCAD
