= LibreDWG =

Software library for handling DWG files

GNU LibreDWG
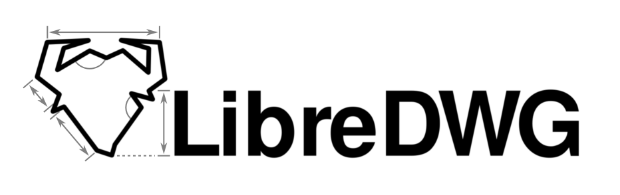
- Developer: GNU Project
- Release: May 16, 2009; 17 years ago
- Stable release: 0.14 / 27 June 2026; 4 months ago
- Written in: C
- Type: Library
- License: GNU General Public License v3
- Website: www.gnu.org/software/libredwg/
- Repository: git.savannah.gnu.org/cgit/libredwg.git

GNU LibreDWG is a software library programmed in C to manage DWG computer files, native proprietary format of computer-aided design software AutoCAD. It aims to be a free software replacement for the OpenDWG libraries. The project is managed by the Free Software Foundation (FSF).

== Motivation ==
The proprietary DWG file format is a de facto standard for many types of CAD. Although the Open Design Alliance develops alternative libraries from the official Autodesk libraries there was a need for a fully free software alternative.

== History ==
GNU LibreDWG is based on the LibDWG library, originally written by Rodrigo Rodrigues da Silva and Felipe Correa da Silva Sanches and licensed as GPLv2 around 2005. In July 2010 the FSF noted the creation of an alternative to the OpenDWG library as one of 13 "high priority projects".

=== GPLv3 controversies ===
In 2009 a license update of LibDWG/LibreDWG to the version 3 of the GNU GPL, made it impossible for the free software projects LibreCAD and FreeCAD to use LibreDWG legally.

Many projects voiced their unhappiness about the GPLv3 license selection for LibreDWG, such as FreeCAD, LibreCAD, Assimp, and Blender. Some suggested the selection of a license with a broader license compatibility, for instance the MIT, BSD, or LGPL 2.1.

A request went to the FSF to relicense GNU LibreDWG as GPLv2, which was rejected in 2012.

=== Refork ===
The project was stalled for a few years starting in 2011; this stall occurred for various reasons, including lack of volunteers, licensing issues and programmer motivation. In September 2013, the original project on which LibreDWG is based, LibDWG, announced that it was reactivating, re-forking its code from LibreDWG. A GPLv2 licensed alternative is the libdxfrw project, which can read simple DWGs. The LibreDWG project has resumed active development, including the addition of more recent .dwg and .dxf formats with version 0.5 in June 2018. The most recent release as of November 2020, version 0.12.5 includes read support for all DWG formats r13+, write support for r2000 DWG and read/write support for all r13+ DXF versions. Since February 2024, the 0.13 release supports reading all existing DWG versions.
