= LumenPnP =

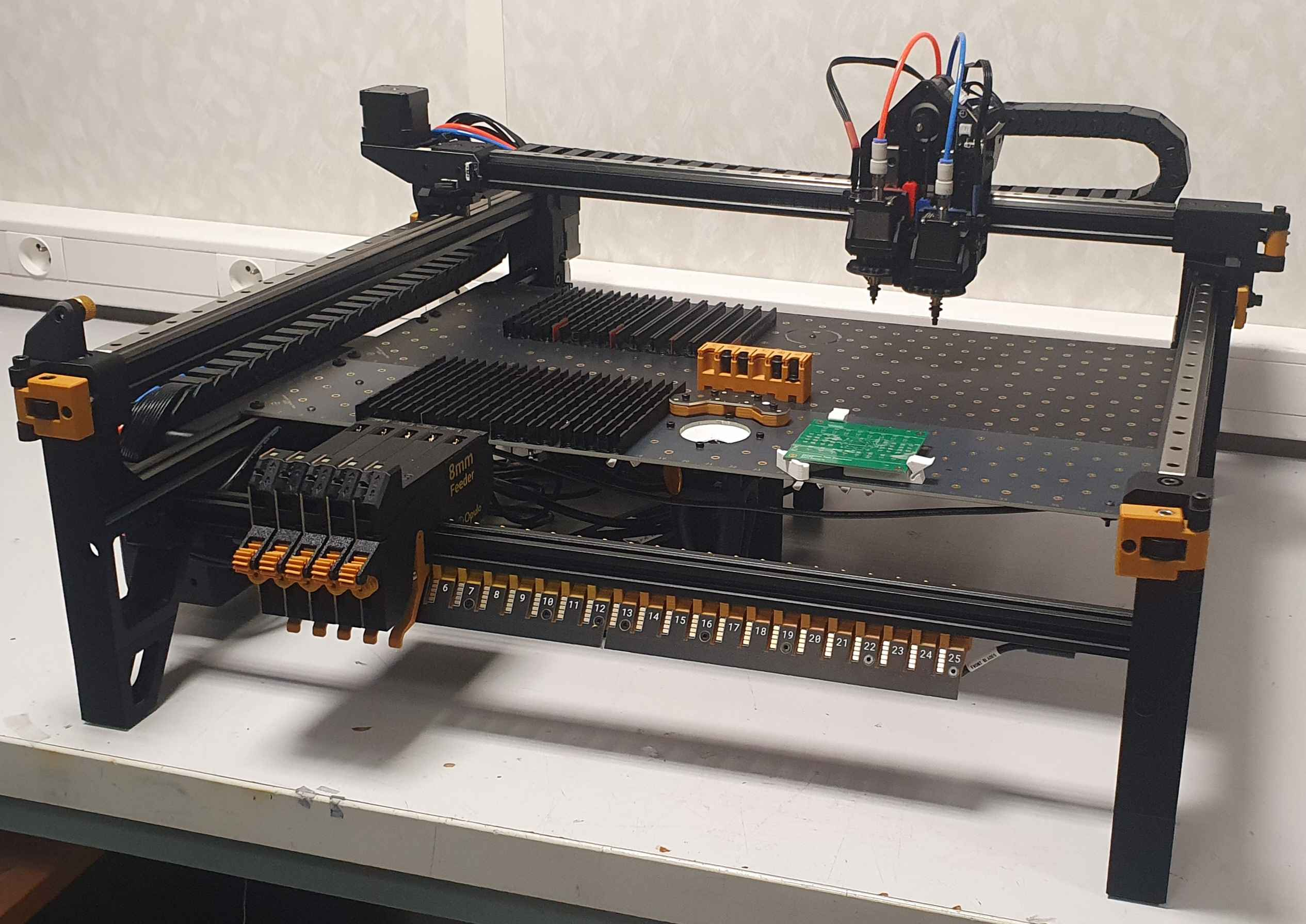
- Classification: Computer numerical control pick-and-place machine
- Types: Open-source pick-and-place machine
- Used with: Electronic assembly
- Inventor: Stephen Hawes
- Related: Pick-and-place machine

LumenPnP is an open-source pick-and-place machine. It is designed to be an accessible solution for hobbyists and organizations to quickly place components on circuit boards.

== History ==
The LumenPnP began as personal project of Stephen Hawes on his YouTube channel in early 2020. While fulfilling a small Kickstarter project he ran in 2019, Hawes was frustrated with the time involved with hand placing electronic components onto the boards needed for the project, and with the prohibitive cost of outsourcing assembly or buying a pick-and-place-machine.

In May 2020, Hawes released the source for the first version of the machine on GitHub, allowing for hundreds of community members to build one themselves.

In April 2021, Hawes founded Opulo to continue development of the LumenPnP and to begin selling machines. Hawes announced in December 2021 that Opulo raised $100,000 using a SAFE note from investor Joel Spolksy. In February 2022, Opulo began selling the LumenPnP.

Originally called the Index, the name of the project was changed in February 2022 following a cease-and-desist request from an unnamed party.

== Design ==
The LumenPnP operates as a belt-driven pick-and-place machine using rails for all linear motion. It is compatible with most SMT components down to 0402. The project also includes custom automatic part feeders. The LumenPnP uses a fixed upward-facing camera for part orientation detection, and a downward-facing camera on the head of the machine for part placement.

== Community ==
The LumenPnP is developed by Opulo alongside the open-source community, on GitHub and the community Discord server. It is designed using open source CAD software. In December 2020, the LumenPnP 3D design was moved from Fusion360 to FreeCAD to improve flexibility in open source distribution. The electronic design is done using KiCAD.

A collection of modifications to the LumenPnP is maintained by the community, along with 3D printed modifications on the 3D file sharing site, Printables.
