= Stemfie =

- Type: Construction set
- Invented by: Paulo Kiefe
- Country: Sweden
- stemfie.org

STEMFIE is an open-source construction set toy system and brand, made out of 3D-printable plastic bricks, that are connected using screws. This construction set is designed with 3D printing and its limitations in mind. In contrast to Lego bricks, the CAD-files for the individual STEMFIE parts are available as open-source on GitHub and the STEMFIE website, licensed under CC BY. Using the bricks, you can build projects, like a functional rubber-band car or a catapult. The STEMFIE construction set was created by Paulo Kiefe on 21 December 2019, who is also the co-creator of the 3DBenchy. Paulo Kiefe presented STEMFIE at the Printed Worldconference 2025 in Amsterdam, Netherlands. All STEMFIE parts are designed in the open-source CAD software FreeCAD.
