= QCAD =

CAD software

- QCAD in Ubuntu 19.10
- Developer: RibbonSoft
- Stable release: 3.32.3.4 / 17 July 2025; 12 months ago
- Written in: C++ (Qt), JavaScript
- Operating system: Windows, macOS, Unix-like, Linux
- Type: CAD software
- License: GPL-3.0-or-later with exceptions for plugins and add-ons
- Website: www.qcad.org/en/
- Repository: github.com/qcad/qcad

QCAD is a computer-aided design (CAD) software application for 2D design and drafting. It is available for Linux, Apple macOS, Unix and Microsoft Windows. The QCAD GUI is based on the Qt framework.

== Description ==
QCAD is partly released under the GNU General Public License. Precompiled packages are available for 32-bit and 64-bit Linux platforms, Microsoft Windows OS and macOS.

QCAD is developed by RibbonSoft. Development on QCAD began in October 1999, starting with code from CAM Expert. QCAD 2, designed to "make QCAD more productive, more user friendly, more flexible and increase its compatibility with other products" began development in May 2002. QCAD 3 was first released in August 2011 with an ECMAScript (JavaScript) interface as major addition.

Some of the interface and concepts behind QCAD are similar to those of AutoCAD.

QCAD uses the DXF file format internally and to save and import files. Support for the popular DWG file format is available as a commercial plugin based on the Open Design Alliance DWG libraries.

Starting from version 3.7 QCAD is distributed as Professional Trial that works for a limited time, or as Community Edition as source code only, so users need to self compile or remove the QCAD Professional add-on running in trial mode.

Although much of the software source is under the GPL-3.0-or-later license there is also significant functionality not available under a free software license.

QCAD has a large library of different templates.

== Multiplatform support ==
QCAD operates on Linux, macOS [10.7 (Lion) or later], UNIX (FreeBSD, NetBSD), Solaris for x86 and SPARC, and Windows [8, 7, Vista, XP, 2000]. This is of importance for collaboration across a diverse computing environment.

== See also ==
- Comparison of computer-aided design software
- LibreCAD, a fork of QCAD 2.0
