= FreeCAD =

Free and open-source 3D CAD software

- Screenshots from FreeCAD version 26.3
- Original authors: Jürgen Riegel, Werner Mayer, Yorik van Havre
- Release: 29 October 2002; 24 years ago
- Stable release: 1.1 / March 24, 2026; 7 months ago
- Preview release: 26.3 (formerly known as 1.2)
- Written in: C++, Python
- Operating system: Linux macOS; Unix; Windows; FreeBSD
- Type: 3D modeling, CAD, CAM, BIM, FEM
- License: LGPL-2.1-or-later
- Website: freecad.org; wiki.freecad.org
- Repository: github.com/FreeCAD/FreeCAD

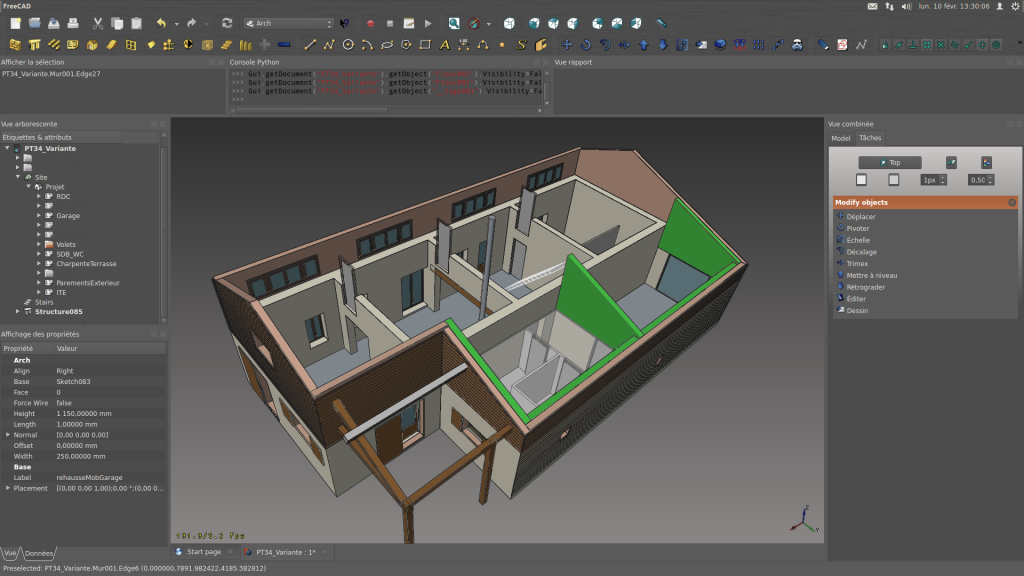
Interior of 3D house

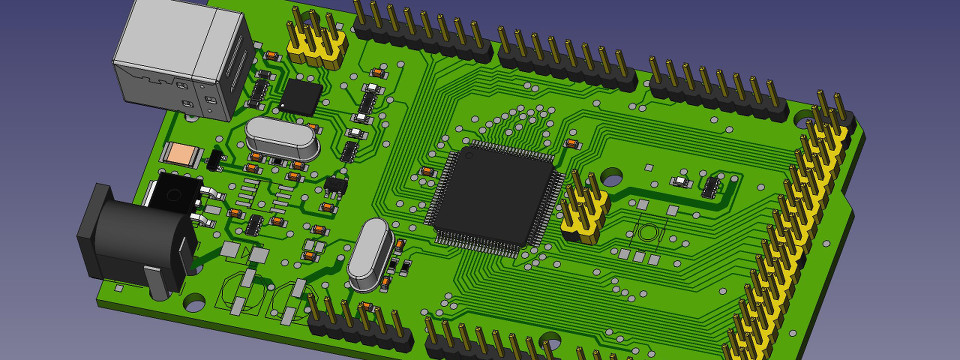
Arduino board imported from Eagle PCB software

FreeCAD is a general-purpose parametric 3D computer-aided design (CAD) modeler and a building information modeling (BIM) software application with finite element method (FEM) support. It is intended for mechanical engineering product design but also expands to a wider range of uses around engineering, such as architecture or electrical engineering. FreeCAD is free and open-source, under the LGPL-2.0-or-later license, and available for Linux, macOS, and Windows operating systems. Users can extend the functionality of the software using the Python programming language.

== Features ==
=== General ===
FreeCAD features tools similar to CATIA, Creo, SolidWorks, Solid Edge, NX, Inventor, Revit, and therefore also falls into the category of building information modeling (BIM), mechanical computer-aided design (MCAD), PLM, CAx and CAE. It is intended to be a feature-based parametric modeler with a modular software architecture, which makes it easy to provide additional functionality without modifying the core system.

As with many modern 3D CAD modelers, FreeCAD has a 2D component to facilitate 3D-to-2D drawing conversion. Under its current state, direct 2D drawing (like AutoCAD LT) is not the focus for this software, and neither are animation or 3D model manipulation (like Blender, Maya, or Cinema 4D). However, the modular nature of FreeCAD allows the user to adapt its workflow for such environments via the use of plugins.

FreeCAD uses open-source libraries from the field of computing science; among them are Open CASCADE Technology (a CAD kernel), Coin3D (an incarnation of Open Inventor), the Qt GUI framework, and Python, a popular scripting language. FreeCAD itself can also be used as a library by other programs.

There are moves to expand FreeCAD into other sectors such as electrical engineering and architecture, engineering, & construction (AEC), and to add building information modeling (BIM) functionality with the Arch Module.

=== Workbenches ===
FreeCAD has a modular structure built from a set of workbenches, where basic workbenches are bundled, and additional workbenches could be created and installed by users. For example, an Omniverse Connector Workbench Plugin enables direct read and write access between FreeCAD and NVIDIA Omniverse, allowing CAD geometry to be synchronised with a remote Nucleus server and shared with other Omniverse-compatible tools.

==== Sketcher Workbench ====
Sketcher Workbench is a default workbench with a set of 2D drafting tools for drawing in specified 2D plane.

==== Part Design Workbench ====
Part Design Workbench is a default workbench for constructing solid geometry (body) by 3D operations from 2D sketches and 3D geometry modification operations (Boolean, pattern, hole making, lathing, etc.).

In FreeCAD, it is possible to use both solid modeling paradigms: top-to-down or down-to-top — so, it is possible to create a cylinder from a circle sketch by extruding it, or by lathing a cube solid with a rectangular sketch turned around any cube axis.

==== Part Workbench ====
Part Workbench is a default workbench for adding solid parts primitives and multibody solids, with a set of tools for solid Boolean operations.

==== Drafting Workbench ====
Drafting Workbench is a default workbench with a set of tools for raw and advanced editing of 2D and 3D geometry. Its used in cases of complex geometry impossible to create or edit with Sketcher, Part Design or Part workbenches.

==== Assembly Workbench ====
Assembly Workbench is a default workbench for assembling parts into multipart assembly connecting each part with various geometric constraints. Also, there are alternative 3rd party workbenches for assembly creating each with different logic and set of constraints.

==== Technical Drawing Workbench ====
Technical Drawing Workbench is a default workbench for generating 2D drawings from 3D view of parts or assembly, with a set of tools for post-processing generated drawing (scaling, views orientation and projection, line and fill editing, adding measurements, GD&T labels, etc.). This workbench is used for producing final shop drawings and specifications documents for printing or export to PDF.

== Supported file formats ==
FreeCAD's own main file format is FreeCAD Standard file format (.FCStd). It is a standard zip file that holds files in a certain structure. The Document.xml file has all geometric and parametric objects definitions. GuiDocument.xml then has visual representation details of objects. Other files include brep-files for objects and thumbnail of drawing.

Besides FreeCAD's own file format, files can be exported and imported in DXF, SVG (Scalable Vector Graphics), STEP, IGES, STL (STereoLithography), OBJ (Wavefront), DAE (Collada), SCAD (OpenSCAD), IV (Inventor) and IFC.

=== DWG support ===
FreeCAD's support for the proprietary DWG file format has been problematic due to software license compatibility problems with the GNU LibreDWG library. The GNU LibreDWG library started as a real free alternative to the source-available OpenDWG library (later Teigha Converter and now ODA File Converter) and is licensed under the GPLv3. As FreeCAD (and also LibreCAD) has dependencies on Open Cascade, which prior to version 6.7.0 was only compatible with GPLv2, it couldn't use the GNU LibreDWG library as GPLv2 and GPLv3 are essentially incompatible. Open CASCADE technology was contacted by Debian team in 2009, and 2012 got a reply that Open CASCADE technology was considering dual-licensing OCCT (the library), however they postponed that move. A request also went to the FSF to relicense GNU LibreDWG as GPLv2 or LGPLv3, which was rejected.

As of 2014 the 0.14 release of FreeCAD, including the new LGPL release of Open Cascade, the BSD-licensed version of Coin3D, and the removal of PyQT, FreeCAD is now completely GPL-free. However, LibreDWG has not been adopted. FreeCAD is able to import and export a limited subset of the DWG format via the ODA File Converter (the former OpenDWG library).

== Promotions during events ==
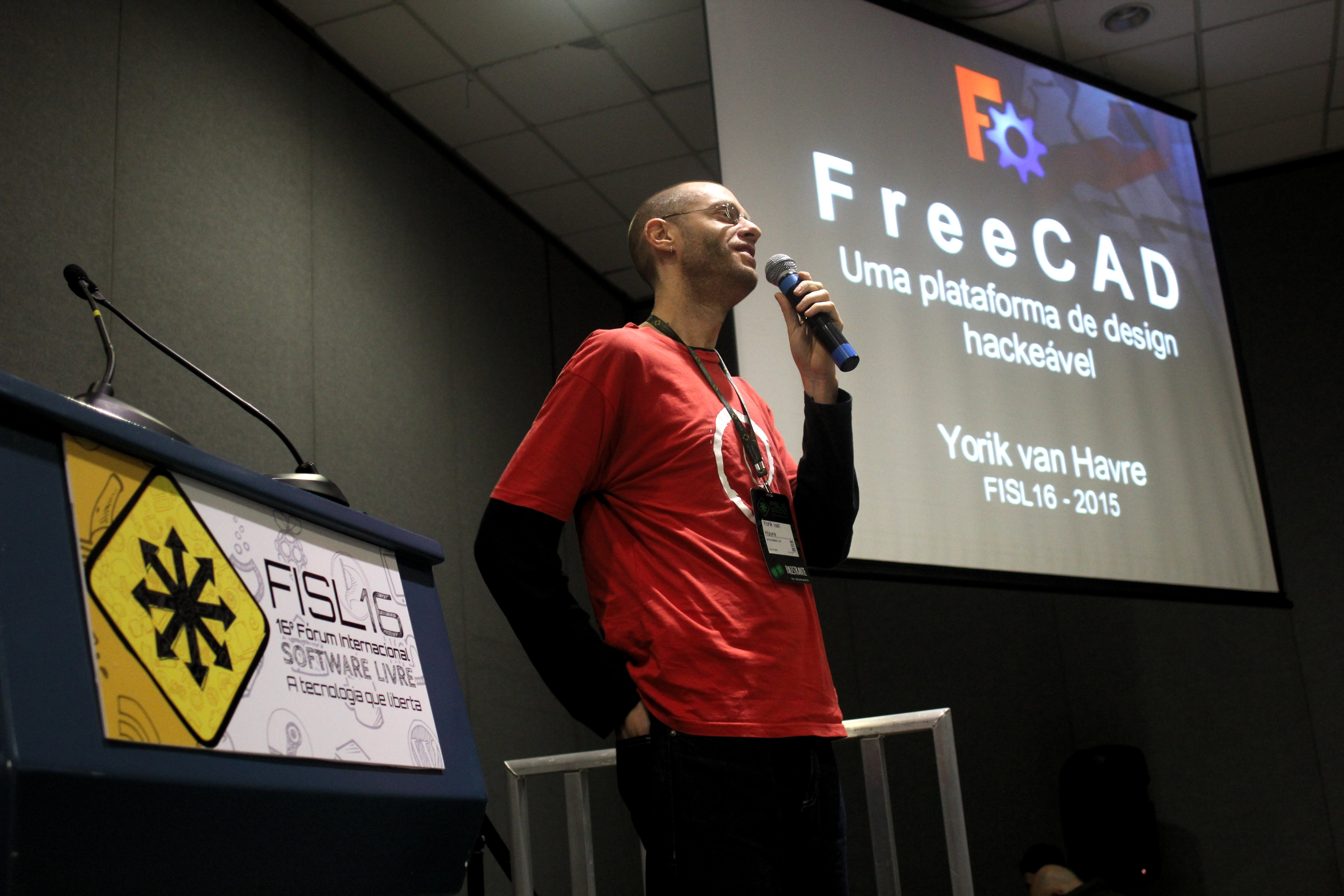
Yorik van Havre presenting FreeCAD at FISL 16 in 2015

FreeCAD was notably presented at FISL 16 in 2015, in Porto Alegre, as well as at the Libre Graphics Meeting in London in 2016. These two exhibitions can bring together both developers and users. In 2020, it was during FOSDEM in Brussels that two of these developers, Yorik Van Havre and Brad Collette made the presentation. On 29 March 2025, Aleksander Sadowski, Altair and the German space agency (DLR) have collectively organised an event, where they showed, how a Mars rover is build and simulated using open-source engineering software, including FreeCAD, PrePoMax, OpenRadioss and ParaView. Aleksander Sadowski has presented FreeCAD in his talk Fully Open-source Workflow for FEM Crash Simulations in Automotive and Aerospace to executives and engineers in R&D from Dassault Systemes, Volkswagen AG, Altair, BMW AG and RWTH Aachen University on 19 April 2025 and on 15 October 2025 at the Konstruktionsleiter-Forum 2025 in his talk Product development process in mechanical engineering using open-source software, organised by Vogel Communications Group, as the last talk of the event to executives from Bechtle PLM and PTC Onshape. Aleksander presented FreeCAD to engineers in a Webinar, organised with the VDI (Association of German engineers) multiple times. Aleksander Sadowski has presented FreeCAD at the OpenChain and Friends 2026 event on March 25th 2026 at Bosch in Stuttgart, Germany, which was organised by Bosch, Mercedes-Benz, The Linux Foundation and the German state Baden-Württemberg. On April 24th 2026 Aleksander presented FreeCAD at the Hannover Messe 2026 trade fair. On May 20th 2026, Aleksander has presented the talk Product Development with FreeCAD at the "Open Source @ Siemens" event in Zug, Switzerland. The talk recording from the Siemens event is available publicly on the "Siemens Knowledge Hub" Youtube channel.

== FreeCAD 1.0 ==
The FreeCAD 1.0 version includes several new features, such as the new assembly workbench; fixes for many bugs, including the topological naming problem; unification and correction of many workbenches; very diverse changes and improvements in the user interface and user experience (UI/UX); and a new logo, chosen from five finalists of the public contest created to renew the brand. It was released on November 18, 2024.

New logo of FreeCAD, designed by Sebastián Tabares (syta.co)

With the release of FreeCAD 1.0 on the horizon, it was decided to make a logo and branding change. At the request of the project managers, the intent of the update was to iterate on the current branding, rather than completely replace it. There is an official guideline for the use of the logo in its short, long and mono version; the recommended and prohibited uses, all available in FPA/images/logos/guidelines/guidelines.pdf at main · FreeCAD/FPA · GitHub.

FreeCAD logo in its long variation, with the wordmark in Evolventa lettering.

== Release history ==
- GitHub Files section (github.com/FreeCAD/FreeCAD)

Version	Release date	Information
0.0.1	October 29, 2002	Initial release
0.1	January 27, 2003	
0.2	August 9, 2005	
0.3	October 31, 2005	
0.4	January 15, 2006	
0.5	October 5, 2006	
0.6	February 27, 2007	
0.7	April 24, 2009	
0.8	July 10, 2009	
0.9	January 16, 2010	
0.10	July 24, 2010	
0.11	May 3, 2011	Sketcher, Part, 2D and Robot modules
0.12	November 20, 2011	Architecture Module
0.13	January 29, 2013	Ship Design module, Openscad module, 3D mice support
0.14	July 1, 2014	License changed to LGPLv2+, spreadsheet module, render to LuxRender
0.15	April 8, 2015	Oculus Rift support, updated ifc importer in Architecture module
0.16	April 18, 2016	FEM workbench, Path module
0.17	April 6, 2018	Addon manager, Surface module, TechDraw module
0.18	March 12, 2019	New Start view, extended Arch module, many improved modules In 0.18.5 Addon-Manager broken, so 0.18.4 is stable release.
0.19	March 20, 2021	Modules to Python 3 and Qt5 mostly ported, actual 0.19.4
0.20	June 14, 2022	Completely rewritten Addon Manager, more than 30 new tools in TechDraw, persistent section cuts, many improvements of existing tools
0.21	August 2, 2023	Planned as the final release before patches for the topological naming problem introduce performance regressions. Various user interface and workbench improvements.
1.0	November 18, 2024	Addressed the topological naming problem. New integrated Assembly workbench, integrated BIM workbench, new material system, and many new features in Sketcher, FEM, PartDesign, and other modules, as well as overall UI improvements.
1.1	March 24, 2026	New Core Datum objects, three-point lighting, and a Clarify Selection tool. PartDesign gains transparent feature previews, interactive draggers, and a redesigned Hole tool. Sketcher adds Projection and Intersection for external geometry. Animations for joints in Assembly and results in FEM, a new tool library for CAM, and many more improvements.
26.3	Not yet determined	First release under the new three-per-year calendar versioning scheme. Multi-document editing with background and fine-grained recomputes, a new Mass Properties tool, Defeaturing and start offsets in PartDesign, a text tool in Sketcher, snapshots, rigid groups and link arrays in Assembly, 3+2 axis and rotary machining in CAM, automatic hexahedral meshing in FEM, OCC 8, and TechDraw improvements.
27.1	Not yet determined	Development version with weekly builds.
Legend: Unsupported Latest version Preview version Future version

== Usage in the industry ==
FreeCAD's popularity is on the rise, reflected in the number of downloads through Github (approx. 20 million, December 2025) and the number of times getting searched for in search engines seen on Google Trends (200% increase from 2020 to 2025). FreeCAD is utilized in the maker space, including by Linus Torvalds, who integrated printed circuit board enclosures into his guitar pedal side project. This guitar pedal project was showcased at KiCon Europe 2025 on 12 September 2025 by Aleksander Sadowski and in a video on the Youtube-channel Linus Tech Tips, where Linus Torvalds was a guest. (see 12:00) Two large companies that have at least partially integrated FreeCAD into their manufacturing process, are Hettich, a furniture fittings company for IKEA, and Melexis, a semiconductor company. FreeCAD is also used in open-source hardware projects such as STEMFIE, an open-source construction toy system for 3D printing, and LumenPnP, a pick and place machine for manufacturing printed circuit boards.

== See also ==
- LibreCAD
- Comparison of computer-aided design software
- Boundary representation
- Constructive solid geometry
- Open CASCADE Technology
- Parametric modeling
- List of BIM software
- List of 3D printing software
