= TranslateCAD =

- Developer(s): TranslationToSpanish.com
- Initial release: 2008
- Stable release: 1.4.4 / April 16, 2010
- Operating system: Microsoft Windows
- Platform: NT/2000/XP/Vista/Windows 7
- Type: Computer Assisted Translation tools
- License: Proprietary software

TranslateCAD is a tool for computer-aided translation software, designed to extract translatable text from CAD drawings saved in the industry-standard DXF format - regardless of the CAD software used to create such drawings - so that professional translators are able to translate in plain text using a number of CAT tools available.

The translatable text is saved in a Unicode Text file that can be translated using any CAT tool available. The advantages of translating out of the drawing CAD software environment are:

- It is faster to translate in plain-text format than using the native MTEXT or TEXT command in AutoCAD.
- The translator is able to re-utilize translation memories, glossaries, dictionaries and other features of the CAT tool being used.
- The special Unicode fonts can be visualized better using the CAT software than the drawing software.

The disadvantages of doing so are:

- Some visibility is lost during the process. Users may need to go back to the drawing to see more context.
- Not 100% of the drawings are not subject to be converted to DXF (See Limitations section).

Once the translator has created the target-language equivalent, TranslateCAD re-creates a DXF drawing that merges the extracted translatable text with the rest of the elements in the DXF file, such as lines, circles, dimensions, page properties, etc.

TranslateCAD is not a CAT tool itself, but a tagger software, that serves as a bridge between the target format and the CAT software.

The translator would need to check (and edit if needed) the target-language drawing in order to accommodate the different lengths of words/phrases into the original layout; applicable specifically when translating between European and Asian/Far East languages, due to the differences found in lengths among ideograms/glyphs and alphabet-based languages.

== File Format Support ==
TranslateCAD reads and writes DXF files, supporting AutoCAD versions from r14 through 2010.

DWG files are not supported directly, although the user may use the Save-as menu within AutoCAD in order to export the drawings to be translated into DXF format. Alternatively, there are a number of shareware or freeware tools that perform this task.

== Known Limitations ==
- TranslateCAD handles only DXF files outside of AutoCAD or compatible software; it is not integrated with the drawing software itself.
- Most legacy drawings were created using the outdated DTEXT (or simply TEXT) object that supports only one line of text, instead of the current MTEXT that handles several lines of text into one single object. The result of using DTEXT is that the translator frequently founds isolated words that sometimes don't make sense without the appropriate context/order. DTEXT object don't support Unicode, so if the drawing is to be translated into a Unicode-based language, the DTEXT objects need to be converted into MTEXT with a lisp macro in AutoCAD.
- If translating from/to a Unicode-based language, the user needs to install an AutoCAD-compatible Unicode font into their system.
- DXF format has glitches: certain drawings are rendered unreadable if saved in the DXF format rather than the Native DWG file format. It is advised to use a different tool for these kind of drawings.

== See also ==
- Computer assisted translation
- AutoCAD
- DXF (Drawing Exchange Format)
- CAD
