= Open Cascade Technology =

Open-source 3D modelling software

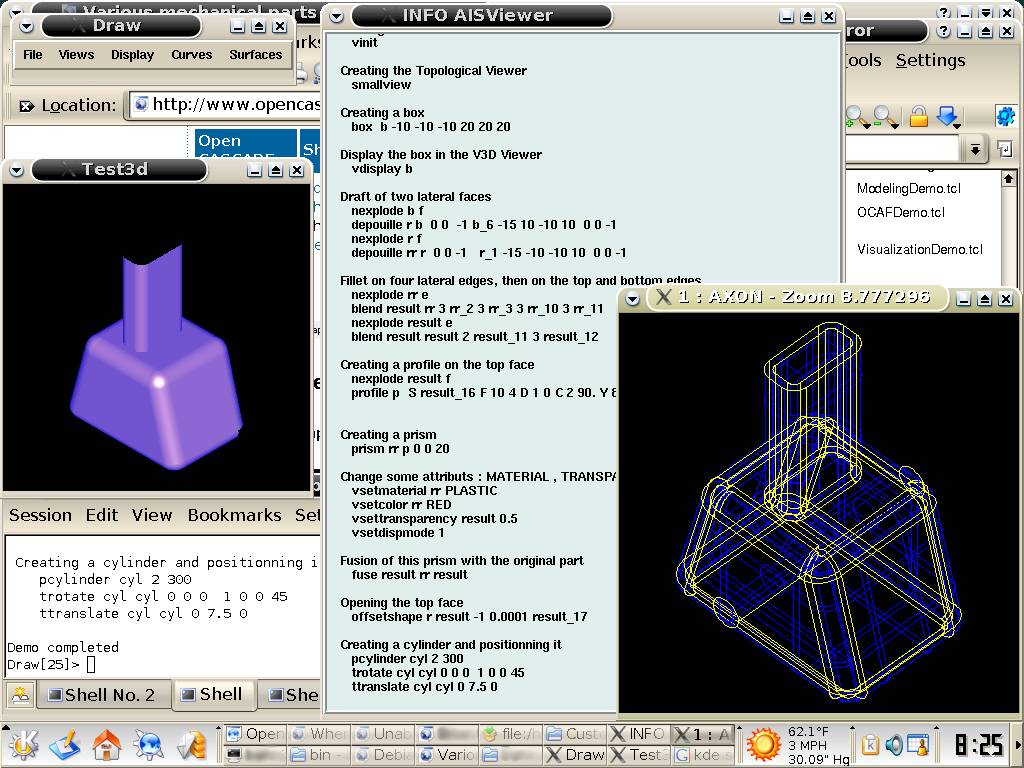
- OpenCASCADE Screenshot
- Developer: Open Cascade S.A.S.U.
- Release: 1999; 27 years ago
- Stable release: 8.0.1 / 30 July 2026; 2 months ago
- Written in: C++
- Operating system: Linux, FreeBSD, macOS, Windows, Android, iOS, WebAssembly
- Platform: IA-32, x86-64, ARM
- Type: CAD, CAM, CAE
- License: LGPL 2.1 only with exception
- Website: dev.opencascade.org
- Repository: git.dev.opencascade.org/gitweb/?p=occt.git

Open Cascade Technology (OCCT, formerly named CAS.CADE) is an object-oriented C++ class library for 3D computer-aided design (CAD), computer-aided manufacturing (CAM), computer-aided engineering (CAE), etc. It is developed and supported by Open Cascade SAS company. It is free and open-source software released under the GNU Lesser General Public License (LGPL), version 2.1 only, which permits open source and proprietary uses.

OCCT is a full-scale boundary representation (B-rep) modeling toolkit.

== History ==
CAS.CADE (abbreviated from computer-aided software for computer-aided design and engineering) was originally developed in the early 1990s by Matra Datavision, developer of Euclid CAD software as the underlying infrastructure for its future version Euclid Quantum. In 1998 the company abandoned software development to concentrate on services, and most of the software development facilities were sold to Dassault Systèmes, developer of competing CATIA.

Product name	Release date	Latest update version	Latest update date	Highlights
Open CASCADE Technology 8.0	2026-05-07	8.0.0	2026-05-07	Upgraded minimum C++ standard to C++17; deprecated global math wrappers in favour of std:: functions.; Source tree reorganized to src/Module/Toolkit/Package/File; documentation generation moved to CMake.; ARM64 is now a first-class target on macOS and Windows; GTest adopted as standard unit-testing framework.; Introduced BRepGraph: new graph-based representation of B-Rep topology with bidirectional traversal and history tracking.; Redesigned geometry evaluation hierarchy with POD result structs (Geom_CurveD1/D2/D3).; New differential-properties packages (GeomProp, Geom2dProp, BRepProp) replacing the legacy LProp family.; Added new collection types: NCollection_FlatMap, NCollection_OrderedMap, NCollection_KDTree.; Added GeomFill_Gordon (transfinite interpolation) and TKHelix (geometric helix toolkit).; STEP export ~20% smaller file size; improved concurrent-operation safety in STEP/IGES read–write.; Improved glTF/OBJ/IGES support for non-uniform scaling, line types and edge preservation.; Unified shader-based grid path (OpenGL 3.2+) with sub-pixel antialiasing; improved selection pipeline.; VTK no longer enabled by default (requires USE_VTK=ON).
Open CASCADE Technology 7.6	2021-11-03	7.6.2	2022-04-29	Added progress indication–abortion to Boolean operations and offset algorithm.; Added support of kinematics entities to STEP reader.; Introduced interface for partial OCAF document reading.
Open CASCADE Technology 7.5	2020-11-05	7.5.3	2021-08-06	Real-time physically based rendering (PBR) using metallic-roughness material model.; WebAssembly target platform support (including WebGL viewer).; UNICODE support in STEP reader–writer.
Open CASCADE Technology 7.4	2019-10-01	—N/a	—N/a	Improved BRepMesh performance, robustness and accuracy.; Improved robustness and stability of Boolean operations and Extrema.; Improved performance of built-in parallelization tools (OSD_Parallel).; Added glTF 2.0 and OBJ readers.; Added AIS_ViewController mapping user input to 3D viewer camera manipulations.; Added support of 3/4 and box clipping configurations to 3D viewer.; Added fast HLR-alike OpenGL rendering mode.; Removed legacy local context functionality from AIS and legacy Boolean operations.
Open CASCADE Technology 7.3	2018-05-29	—N/a	—N/a	Added algorithm constructing OBB (oriented bounding box).; Optimized surface intersection, shape offset and Boolean operation algorithms.; Added distance and size culling rendering features.; Added support of UNICODE filenames with MinGW-w64.
Open CASCADE Technology 7.2	2017-08-31	—N/a	—N/a	Added support of OCAF binary files larger than 2 GiB.; Added "Glue" option to Boolean algorithms.; Added support of annotations, saved views and clipping planes to STEP and XDE.; Added Weighted OIT (Order-independent transparency) rendering feature.; Path Tracing engine improvements.
Open CASCADE Technology 7.1	2016-11-25	—N/a	—N/a	OCAF persistence without dynamically loaded plugins.; Improved STEP AP242 support, including PMI, dimensions and annotations.; Improved rendering performance of Wireframe AIS_Shape presentation.; Added AIS_Manipulator for interactive object transformations in 3D viewer.; TKOpenGl now uses GLSL programs by default.
Open CASCADE Technology 7.0	2016-04-05	—N/a	—N/a	WOK (Workshop Organization Kit) has been replaced by CMake building scripts.; CDL files have been replaced by pre-generated C++ headers.
Open CASCADE Technology 6.9	2015-05-12	6.9.1	2015-09-28	Introduced "Fuzzy" Boolean operations with specified global tolerance.; Introduced built-in multi-threading parallelization tools as alternative to Threading Building Blocks (TBB) library.; Improved robustness of surface-surface intersection and curve on surface projection.; Improved performance of p-curve reconstruction within STEP import.; Improved compatibility with OpenGL ES 2.0.
Open CASCADE Technology 6.8	2014-11-10	—N/a	—N/a	Added support of UNICODE (UTF-8) filenames.; Added STL-compatible iterators to NCollection classes.; "Handle" smart-pointer now uses NULL pointer instead of a special value 0xfefd0000.; Added bounding volume hierarchy (BVH) algorithms and structures.; Introduced multi-threaded version of Boolean operation algorithm.; Introduced limited OpenGL ES 2.0 support in 3D viewer.; Added VIS–TKIVtk component providing a B-Rep shape presentation builder for VTK viewer.; Added support of stereoscopic displays within 3D viewer.; Added frustum culling feature improving rendering performance.; Ray-Tracing engine has been switched from OpenCL to GLSL implementation.
Open CASCADE Technology 6.7	2013-12-18	6.7.1	2014-04-30	License changed to LGPL-2.1-only with added exception.; Built-in GPU-accelerated Ray-Tracing rendering engine using OpenCL.
Open CASCADE Technology 6.6	2013-04-22	—N/a	—N/a	
Open CASCADE Technology 6.5	2011-04-04	6.5.5	2013-03-29	
Open CASCADE Technology 6.4	2010-09-30	—N/a	—N/a	Added multi-threaded mode to BRepMesh algorithm (introduced optional TBB library support).; Improved rendering performance by using Vertex buffer object (VBO).; TKOpenGl implementation converted from C to C++ classes.; Improved text rendering with help of FTGL and FreeType libraries.; Improved algorithms for line-line, line-plane and plane-plane intersection.
Open CASCADE Technology 6.3	2008-09-03	6.3.1	2009-06-19	
Open CASCADE Technology 6.2	?	6.2.1	2007-12-06	
Open CASCADE Technology 6.1	2006-03-24	6.1.1	2006-10-16	
Open CASCADE Technology 5.2	?	5.2.4	2005-07-29	
Open CASCADE Technology 5.1	?	5.1.3	2004-04-23	"Open CASCADE" has been renamed to "Open CASCADE Technology".
Open CASCADE 4.0	2001-12-11	—N/a	—N/a	
Open CASCADE 3.0	2000-04-24	—N/a	—N/a	
Open CASCADE 2.0	?	—N/a	—N/a	
Open CASCADE 1.0	1999	—N/a	—N/a	

=== Open sourcing ===
In 1999 Matra Datavision decided to publish its CAS.CADE infrastructure under an open-source model under the Open CASCADE Technology Public License and renamed it Open Cascade.

In 2000, a separate company, Open Cascade SAS, was created to make business around Open Cascade. Open Cascade SAS was sold in 2003 to Principia, a French service provider corporation, and then in 2006 it was acquired by Euriware Group, a subsidiary of Areva.

In 2004, software was renamed to Open Cascade Technology in order to distinguish it from the name of the company itself.

Open Cascade S.A.S. provides a certified version of the library, which is released sporadically, usually 1–2 releases per year. Until version 6.5.0 (2011), only minor and major versions were publicly available, while intermediate (maintenance) releases were accessible only to customers of Open Cascade S.A.S. For example, version 6.3.0 was publicly released in 2008, and the next public version 6.5.0 was released in early 2011. All recent releases starting from version 6.5.0 are public.

=== Community fork ===
In March 2011, Thomas Paviot initiated a fork of the then most recent publicly available version 6.5.0 of Open Cascade library. The initiative is named Open Cascade Community Edition. The project aims to establish a separate community-based release and bug-report process for the library.

=== Collaborative development portal ===
In December 2011, Open Cascade installed a web portal for external contributors and made its Mantis Bug Tracker and further Git repository publicly available (read-only GitHub mirror has been established in '2020). According to the statements on the new website, external contributors from the Open Source Community are encouraged to participate in the development of Open Cascade Technology, i.e. register bugs directly in the bugtracker, make contributions to the code after signing a Contributor License Agreement, etc.

=== License change ===
Since 18 December 2013, with version 6.7.0, Open Cascade Technology is available under the LGPL-2.1-only with added exception. Versions before that were licensed under the "Open Cascade Technology Public License" which was not compatible with the GPL and was considered non-free by the Fedora project.

== Functions ==
=== Object libraries ===
OCCT's functionality is split into several large modules. Each module defines a list of toolkits (libraries). Key modules:

- Foundation Classes – defines basic classes, memory allocators, OS abstraction layer, collections (data maps, arrays, etc.), acceleration data structures (BVH trees) and vector/matrix math used by other Modules.
- Modeling Data – supplies data structures to represent 2D and 3D geometric primitives (analytical curves: Line, circle, ellipse, hyperbola, parabola, Bézier, B-spline, offset; analytical surfaces: plane, cylinder, cone, sphere, torus, Bézier, B-spline, revolution, extrusion, offset) and their compositions into boundary representation (B-rep) models.
- Modeling Algorithms – contains a vast range of geometrical and topological algorithms (intersection, Boolean operations, surface meshing, fillets, shape healing).
- Visualization (rendering) – provides interactive services for displaying geometry in 3D Viewer; implements a compact OpenGL–OpenGL ES renderer, supporting conventional Phong, real-time PBR metal-roughness shading models and interactive ray tracing – path tracing engine.
- Data Exchange – provides possibility to import–export various CAD formats.
  STEP, IGES, glTF, OBJ, STL, and VRML are supported natively. Other formats can be imported by using plug-ins. Extended Data Exchange (XDE) components rely on a unified XCAF document definition, which includes an assembly structure of CAD shapes, color/name/material/metadata/layer attributes and other supplementary information like product and manufacturing information (PMI).
- Application Framework – offers means to handle application-specific data.
- DRAW Test Harness – implements a scripting interface to OCCT algorithms based on Tcl-interpreter for interactive use, automating processes, prototyping applications and testing purposes.

=== Workshop Organization Kit ===
Workshop Organization Kit (WOK) is Open Cascade development environment, which has been designed to allow many developers to work on a product, exploiting one common reference version shared over a local area network (LAN).

Until OCCT 7.0.0 release, substantial modifications in the source code were not possible without using WOK, since it is the only tool that provides support for CDL (CAS.CADE definition language), used for declaration of most of OCCT classes and also serving to define logical structure of OCCT libraries. WOK has been included in previous OCCT distributions; since OCCT version 6.4 it is made an independent tool.

Within 7.0.0 release, all CDL files have been dropped from OCCT source code making WOK no longer necessary for OCCT development.

=== Working with IFC files ===
The Open CASCADE IFC Import SDK provides applications with the capability of reading building information modeling (BIM) data from files in Industry Foundation Classes (IFC) format. It supports versions IFC2×3 and IFC4 that used by most modern applications.

This allows visualizing and manipulating building geometries and CAD designs.

External tools are available to convert from Open CASCADE to IFC also.

== CAD programs based on Open Cascade Technology ==
Several CAD programs rely on Open CASCADE Technology including:

- FreeCAD an open-source 3D parametric modeler, with support for building information modeling, finite element method (FEM), and Python scripting.
- SALOME an open-source platform for pre- and post-processing for numerical simulation.
- KiCad an open-source suite for electronic design automation (EDA).
- Gmsh an open-source finite-element mesh (FEM) generator. Since version 3.0, Gmsh supports full constructive solid geometry features, based on OCCT.
- FORAN an integrated CAD/CAM/CAE system developed by SENER for the design and production of practically any naval ship and offshore unit. FORAN uses OCCT since V80R2.0 release for working with analytical surfaces.

== See also ==
- Free hardware
- Computer-aided design
- Open Design Alliance
- Building information modeling
- Industry Foundation Classes
