= Free-form select =

Printmaking and design technique

Result of a Free-Form Select

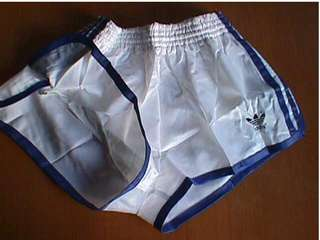
Original

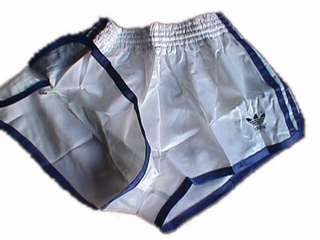
Result

Free-Form Select (with synonyms) is a technique in printmaking, graphic design and image processing.

The effect is to erase background colors or elements from a motif to create stand-alone objects. Today, this is done with graphics software (computer graphics) and computers rather than by cutting away parts with scissors or scalpels.

Almost every modern graphics software includes this feature, such as CorelDRAW, Adobe Photoshop, GIMP, and Microsoft Paint. The motif which is to be cut-out freehanded is defined by a border path around the motif.

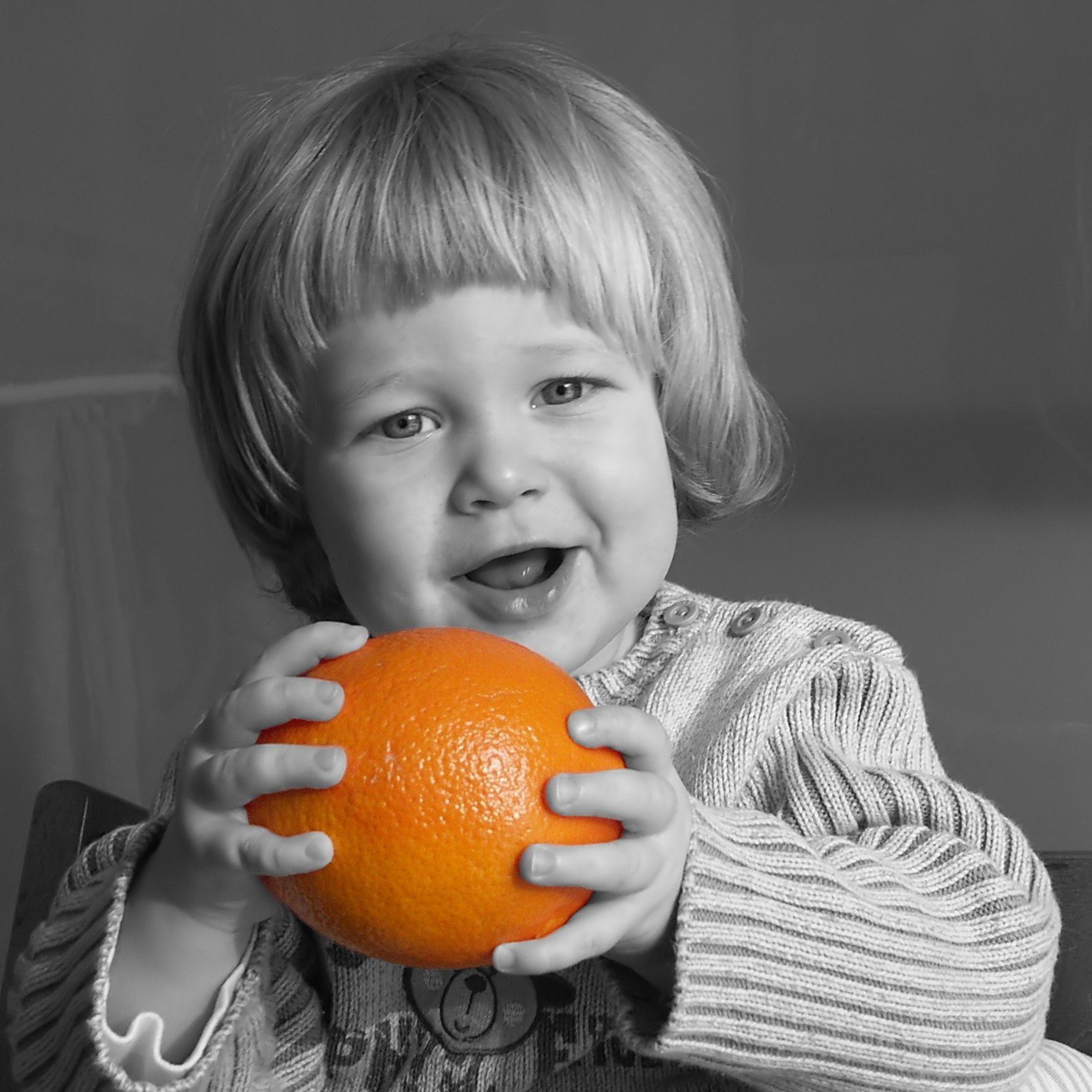
Coloring is a core motif in a black-and-white image.

Free-Form Select is also understood in coloring parts of black-and-white images and vice versa. Coloring a single object within a black-and-white environment is sometimes called Sin City effect.

== See also ==
- Chroma key
- Computer-aided design
- Cropping (image)
- Vignetting (scene setting in photography)
