= Euriware =

EURIWARE
- Company type: Private (Subsidiary of Capgemini)
- Industry: Consulting, IT
- Headquarters: Guyancourt, France
- Area served: Worldwide
- Key people: Francois Hucher, CEO
- Services: Consulting, Systems Integration, Outsourcing
- Revenue: 296 M€ (2010)
- Number of employees: 2220 employees
- Parent: Capgemini
- Subsidiaries: Former subsidiaries: PEA, OPEN CASCADE
- Website: euriware.com

EURIWARE was a French company that provided advanced Consultancy and IT services in the spheres of energy, industry and defense.

The core business of EURIWARE included consultancy, systems integration (enterprise systems, industrial and technical systems) and outsourcing. EURIWARE was fully owned by AREVA group, a French energy corporation mainly known as a nuclear power provider.

== Offices ==
The company had 13 locations in France and 2 locations abroad:

- in the USA, through former AREVA Federal Services
- in Russia, through its subsidiary OPEN CASCADE which became a direct subsidiary of Capgemini since the merger of EURIWARE with Capgemini in 2015.

== Services ==
- Systems Integration
- Consulting (through its former subsidiary PEA Consulting)
- Outsourcing (through its former subsidiary OPEN CASCADE)

== Acquisition ==
On May 7, 2014, EURIWARE was acquired by Capgemini

On June 17, 2015, EURIWARE was merged with its mother company, Capgemini
