= Euclid (computer program) =

CAD software

Euclid is a CAD software which has been developed since 1970. Initially written by Jean Marc Brun and Michel Théron at Laboratoire d'informatique pour la mécanique et les sciences de l'ingénieur (LIMSI) for modelling fluid flow, they founded their own company, Datavision, in 1979, then sold a controlling interest in 1980 to the French company Matra Datavision.

Matra then developed EUCLID QUANTUM, a new generation in 1996, on the CAS.CADE (Computer Aided Software for Computer Aided Design and Engineering) platform. As in 1998 Matra Datavision specialized in software service provider, Dassault Systèmes acquired QUANTUM products : Euclid Styler and Euclid Machinist.

In 1999 Matra Datavision published CAS.CADE in open source on the Internet as Open CASCADE later renamed to Open CASCADE Technology.

The BRL-CAD CAD software imports and exports to the EUCLID file format.
