= .dwg =

File format family

DWG
- Filename extension: .dwg (plain).dws (standards).dwt (template)
- Internet media type: image/vnd.dwg
- Developed by: Autodesk, Open Design Alliance and others
- Initial release: 1982; 44 years ago
- Type of format: Computer-aided design
- Open format?: Open but proprietary

DWG (from drawing) is a proprietary binary file format used for storing two- and three-dimensional design data and metadata. It is the native format for several CAD packages including DraftSight, AutoCAD, ZWCAD, IntelliCAD (and its variants), Caddie and Open Design Alliance compliant applications. In addition, DWG is supported non-natively by many other CAD applications. The .bak (drawing backup), .dws (drawing standards), .dwt (drawing template) and .sv$ (temporary automatic save) files are also DWG files.

== Version history ==
Version	Internal version	AutoCAD versions
DWG R1.0	MC0.0	AutoCAD Release 1.0
DWG R1.2	AC1.2	AutoCAD Release 1.2
DWG R1.40	AC1.40	AutoCAD Release 1.40
DWG R2.05	AC1.50	AutoCAD Release 2.05
DWG R2.10	AC2.10	AutoCAD Release 2.10
DWG R2.21	AC2.21	AutoCAD Release 2.21
DWG R2.22	AC1001, AC2.22	AutoCAD Release 2.22
DWG R2.50	AC1002	AutoCAD Release 2.50
DWG R2.60	AC1003	AutoCAD Release 2.60
DWG R9	AC1004	AutoCAD Release 9
DWG R10	AC1006	AutoCAD Release 10
DWG R11/12	AC1009	AutoCAD Release 11, AutoCAD Release 12
DWG R13	AC1012	AutoCAD Release 13
DWG R14	AC1014	AutoCAD Release 14
DWG 2000	AC1015	AutoCAD 2000, AutoCAD 2000i, AutoCAD 2002
DWG 2004	AC1018	AutoCAD 2004, AutoCAD 2005, AutoCAD 2006
DWG 2007	AC1021	AutoCAD 2007, AutoCAD 2008, AutoCAD 2009
DWG 2010	AC1024	AutoCAD 2010, AutoCAD 2011, AutoCAD 2012
DWG 2013	AC1027	AutoCAD 2013, AutoCAD 2014, AutoCAD 2015, AutoCAD 2016, AutoCAD 2017
DWG 2018	AC1032	AutoCAD 2018, AutoCAD 2019, AutoCAD 2020, AutoCAD 2021, AutoCAD 2022, AutoCAD 2023, AutoCAD 2024, AutoCAD 2025, AutoCAD 2026, AutoCAD 2027

== History ==
DWG (denoted by the .dwg filename extension) was the native file format for the Interact CAD package, developed by Mike Riddle in the late 1970s, and subsequently licensed by Autodesk in 1982 as the basis for AutoCAD. From 1982 to 2009, Autodesk created versions of AutoCAD which wrote no fewer than 18 major variants of the DWG file format, none of which is publicly documented.

The DWG format is probably the most widely used format for CAD drawings. Autodesk estimates that in 1998 there were in excess of two billion DWG files in existence.

There are several claims to control of the DWG format. As the biggest and most influential creator of DWG files it is Autodesk who designs, defines, and iterates the DWG format as the native format for their CAD applications. Autodesk sells a read/write library, called RealDWG, under selective licensing terms for use in non-competitive applications. Several companies have attempted to reverse engineer Autodesk's DWG format, and offer software libraries to read and write Autodesk DWG files. The most successful is Open Design Alliance, a non-profit consortium created in 1998 by a number of software developers (including competitors to Autodesk); it released a read/write/view library called the OpenDWG Toolkit, which was based on the MarComp AUTODIRECT libraries. (ODA has since rewritten and updated that code.)

In 1998, Autodesk added file verification to AutoCAD R14.01, through a function called DWGCHECK. This function was supported by an encrypted checksum and product code (called a "watermark" by Autodesk), written into DWG files created by the program. In 2006 Autodesk modified AutoCAD 2007, to include "TrustedDWG technology", a function which would embed a text string within DWG files written by the program: "Autodesk DWG. This file is a Trusted DWG last saved by an Autodesk application or Autodesk licensed application." This helped Autodesk software users ensure that the files they were opening were created by an Autodesk, or RealDWG application, reducing risk of incompatibilities. AutoCAD would pop up a message, warning of potential stability problems, if a user opened a 2007 version DWG file which did not include this text string.

In 2008 the Free Software Foundation asserted the need for an open replacement for the DWG format, as neither RealDWG nor DWGdirect are licensed on terms that are compatible with free software license like the GNU GPL. Therefore, the FSF placed the goal 'Replacement for OpenDWG libraries' in 10th place on their High Priority Free Software Projects list. Created in late 2009, GNU LibreDWG is a free software library released under the terms of the GNU GPLv3 license. It can read DWG files from version R13 up to 2021, and write R2000 DWG files.

Also in 2008 Autodesk and Bentley Systems agreed on exchange of software libraries, including Autodesk RealDWG, to improve the ability to read and write the companies' respective DWG and DGN formats in mixed environments with greater fidelity. In addition, the two companies will facilitate work process interoperability between their AEC applications through supporting the reciprocal use of available Application Programming Interfaces (APIs).

=== Autodesk trademark ===
On November 13, 2006, Autodesk sued the Open Design Alliance alleging that its DWGdirect libraries infringed Autodesk's trademark for the word "Autodesk", by writing the TrustedDWG watermark (including the word "AutoCAD") into DWG files it created. Nine days later, Autodesk's attorneys won a broad and deep temporary restraining order against the Open Design Alliance. In April 2007, the suit was settled, essentially on Autodesk's terms, with Autodesk modifying the warning message in AutoCAD 2008 (to make it somewhat less alarming), and the Open Design Alliance removing support for writing the TrustedDWG watermark from its DWGdirect libraries. The effect of the temporary restraining order and subsequent consent decree was to render the Open Design Alliance's DWGdirect libraries, from one point of view, incapable of creating DWG files that are 100% compatible with AutoCAD. Others point out that the failure of "100% compatibility" means only that loading such a drawing triggers an essentially irrelevant warning message when the file is opened in AutoCAD.

In 2006, Autodesk applied for registration of US trademarks on "DWG", "DWG EXTREME", "DWG TRUECONVERT", "REALDWG", "DWGX", "DWG TRUEVIEW". As early as 1996, Autodesk has disclaimed exclusive use of the DWG mark in US trademark filings. Out of these applications, only TRUSTEDDWG has been registered as a trademark by the USPTO. The REALDWG and DWGX registrations were opposed by SolidWorks. The DWG EXTREME, DWG TRUECONVERT, and DWG TRUEVIEW trademark registration applications all received substantial resistance, with the USPTO examining attorney requiring Autodesk to disclaim exclusive use of DWG as a condition for their registration.

In a non-final action in May 2007, the USPTO examining attorney refused to register the two DWG marks, as they are "merely descriptive" of the use of DWG as a file format name. In September 2007, Autodesk responded, claiming that DWG has gained a "secondary meaning," separate from its use as a generic file format name.

As of June 22, 2008, all of Autodesk's DWG-related trademark registration proceedings were suspended by the USPTO, pending disposition of trademark opposition and cancellation petitions Autodesk had filed against the Open Design Alliance and Dassault Systèmes SolidWorks Corporation. The USPTO office actions notifying Autodesk of this noted that Autodesk was not the exclusive source of files with the format name DWG, and Autodesk does not control the use of DWG by others, either as a trademark or as a file format name, among other points.

In 2006, Autodesk filed an opposition with the USPTO to the trademark registration of DWGGATEWAY by SolidWorks. Autodesk subsequently filed a petition for cancellation of SolidWorks' trademark registration for DWGEDITOR. In both cases, Autodesk's basis was that they had "been using the DWG name with its CAD software products since at least as early as 1983." The opposition and cancellation actions were consolidated, and suspended pending disposition of Autodesk's US District Court suit against SolidWorks.

In early 2007, Autodesk petitioned the USPTO to cancel the Open Design Alliance's "OpenDWG" trademarks, claiming that they had been abandoned. This cancellation action was suspended pending disposition of Autodesk's US District Court suit against SolidWorks.

In 2008, Autodesk sued SolidWorks in US District Court, arguing that through its marketing efforts, the term "DWG" has lost its original generic meaning and taken on a secondary meaning referring specifically to Autodesk's proprietary drawing file format, and therefore any use of "DWG" in competitive products amounted to trademark infringement. In January 2010, on the morning that trial was scheduled to begin, Autodesk and SolidWorks settled the suit, with SolidWorks acknowledging Autodesk's trademark rights for DWG, surrendering its trademark registrations for its DWG related projects, and withdrawing its opposition to Autodesk's DWG-related trademark registrations.

In April 2010, Autodesk and the Open Design Alliance settled their suit, with the Open Design Alliance agreeing to cancel its DWG-based trademark registrations and cease use of DWG and DWG-based trademarks in its product marketing and branding. Because there was no adjudication in either case, the agreements between the parties are not binding upon the USPTO. In March 2010, the Office of the Deputy Commissioner for Trademark Examination Policy at the USPTO determined that evidence submitted by the Open Design Alliance two years earlier was relevant and supported a reasonable ground for refusal to register DWG as a trademark.

In June 2011 the USPTO issued a final refusal to register DWG as a trademark owned by Autodesk. They were quoted as saying:

DWG is merely descriptive of applicant's goods under Section 2(e)(1) of the Trademark Act for two reasons: (1) DWG is a recognized abbreviation for "drawing," and (2) .dwg is a file format used for computer-aided design (CAD) drawings made both with applicant's CAD software and others' CAD software.

Autodesk appealed the decision. The USPTO affirmed in 2013 their refusal to recognise DWG as a trademark. Despite this, Autodesk websites still claimed DWG as a trademark after the decision.

In late 2014 Autodesk again lost, this time at the United States District Court for the Eastern District of Virginia. The judge dismissed all their arguments.

In 2015 Autodesk's website has a section title About DWG in which they try to make a distinction between .dwg as a file format and the DWG technology environment.

== DWG support in freemium and free software ==
As neither RealDWG nor DWGdirect are licensed on terms that are compatible with free software licenses like the GNU GPL, in 2008 the Free Software Foundation asserted the need for an open replacement for the DWG format. Therefore, the FSF placed the goal 'Replacement for OpenDWG libraries' in 10th place on their High Priority Free Software Projects list. Forked in late 2009 from libDWG, GNU LibreDWG can read all DWG files from version R1.2 on. But the LibreDWG library, offered under the GNU GPLv3, could initially not be used by most targeted FOSS graphic software, such as FreeCAD, LibreCAD and Blender, because of a GPLv2/GPLv3 license incompatibility. A GPLv2 licensed alternative is the libdxfrw project, which can read simple DWGs. Some of these CAD licenses were only fixed recently to be able to use LibreDWG's GPLv3.

FreeCAD is a free and open-source application that can work with the DWG files by using the proprietary ODA File Converter for .dwg and .dxf files from the Open Design Alliance (ODA). The ODA also provides a freeware stand-alone viewer for .dwg and .dgn files, ODA Drawings Explorer, which runs on Windows, Linux, and Mac OS X.

LibreCAD is a free and open-source 2D CAD application that can open DWG and DXF files using its own library.

The quality of DWG format compatibility in these non-Autodesk CAD applications can be assessed using the Budweiser.dwg benchmark drawing.

Autodesk DWG TrueView is a freeware, closed source, stand-alone DWG viewer with DWG TrueConvert software included, built on the same viewing engine as AutoCAD software. The freeware Autodesk Design Review software adds a possibility to open DWG files in Design Review to take advantage of measure and markup capabilities, sheet set organization, and status tracking.

== See also ==
- ISO 10303-21 – Widely used CAD 3D data exchange file format
- CAD data exchange – Method of CAD drawing file translation
- AutoCAD DXF – CAD software interoperability file format
- ZWCAD – Software application
- BricsCAD – Computer-aided design software
- CAD – Constructing product by means of computer
- Comparison of CAD software
- Comparison of CAD, CAM and CAE file viewers
- Design Web Format – Type of file format
- FreeCAD – Free and open-source 3D CAD software
- GstarCAD – Computer aided design software
- IntelliCAD – CAD editor and development platform
- LibreDWG – Software library for handling DWG files
- LibreCAD – Free and open-source 2D CAD software
- OpenDWG – Nonprofit organization creating SDKs for engineering applications
- Open Design Alliance – Nonprofit organization creating SDKs for engineering applications
