= Unified System for Design Documentation (Russia) =

Russian standard for technical designs and drawings

Unified System for Design Documentation (USDD, ESKD, Russian: Единая Система Конструкторской Документации, lit. 'Unified System for Engineering Documentation', ЕСКД, GOST 2.316-2013) is a subset of Russian State and Eurasian Economic Union Standards (GOST) for technical drawings. Just like many GOSTs it's edited and issued by Russian Federal Agency on Technical Regulating and Metrology (Rosstandart) and international body of Euroasian Interstate council (EASC) subsidiary for standardisation.

The latest revision was published in 2013.

== See also ==
- System for construction project documentation (Russia)
