= Hettich (company) =

German furniture fittings manufacturer

- Type: Multinational corporation
- Industry: Manufacturers of furniture fittings
- Founded: 1888
- Headquarters: Westphalia, Germany
- Key people: Dr. Andreas Hettich, (Chairman & Owner of The Hettich Group); Jana Schönfeld + Sascha Groß, (CEO)
- Products: Assembly machinery, hinges, drawer & runner systems, office hardware systems, connecting fittings
- Revenue: 1.5 billion Euros
- Number of employees: 8000 (2022)
- Website: hettich.com

The Hettich Group is a German family business manufacturing furniture fittings headquartered in Kirchlengern, North Rhine-Westphalia.

In 2022, 8000 employees worldwide worked for Hettich, of which more than 3800 are in Germany. The company has 38 subsidiaries worldwide.

== History ==
Karl Hettich founded a metal industry in the Black Forest in 1888 and developed the so-called "Buckmaschine" for bending anchor hooks for pendulum clocks. After the death of the founder of the company in 1894, his widow and later the eldest son Franz Hettich continued the operation with six employees. Franz Hettich later recognized market opportunities for hinges for small watch cases and developed products for this segment. In 1921 Franz Hettich took his four brothers Paul, August, Ferdinand and Josef Hettich into the company. In 1928 August Hettich developed the first fully automatic bar hinge machine for the production of piano bands.

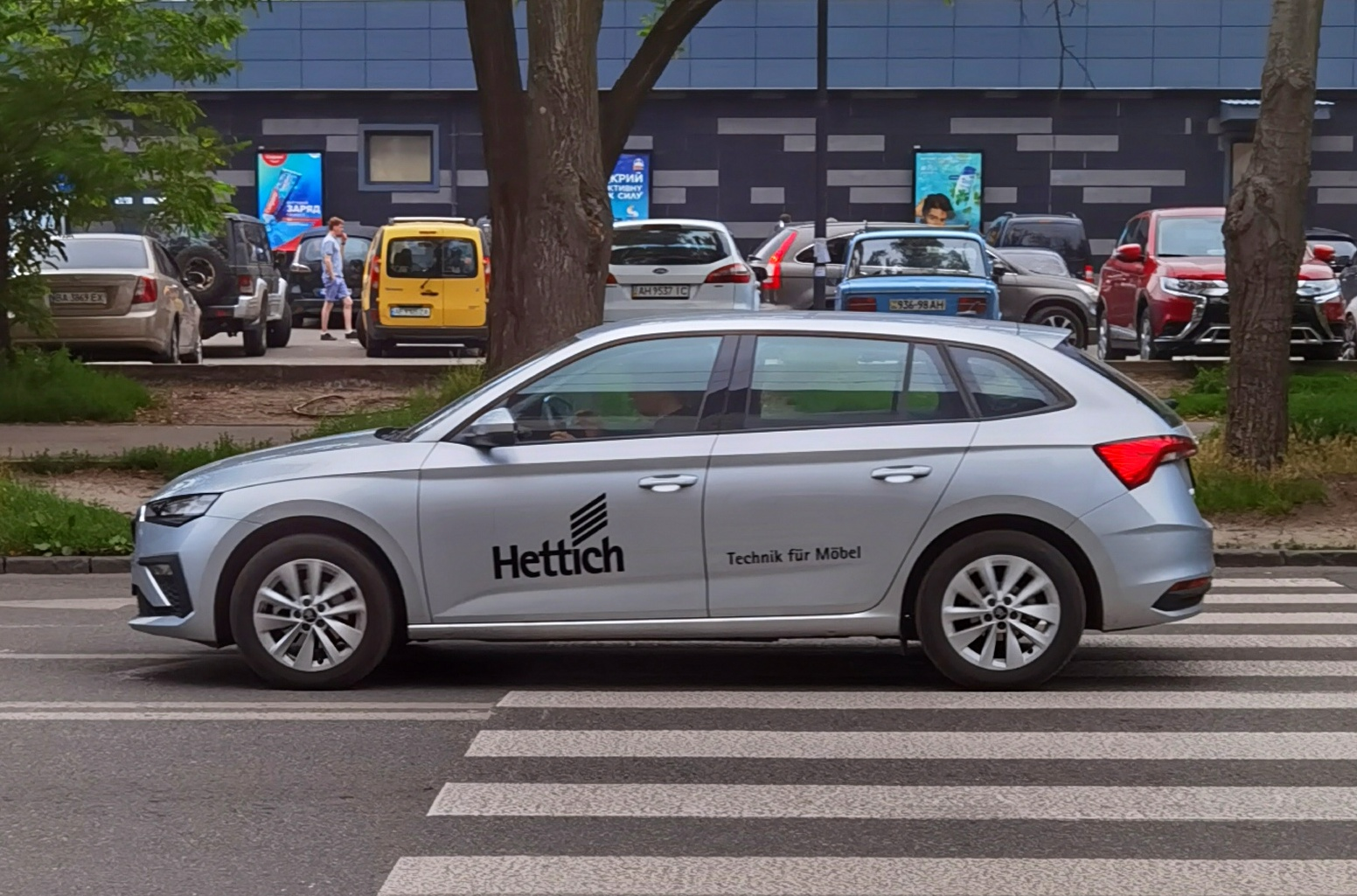
Hettich car in Dnipro, Ukraine.

In 1930, Paul Hettich GmbH was founded in Herford, a centre of the furniture industry. Bar hinges for the furniture industry were produced with seven employees. In 1933 the production of wood screws was taken and in 1936 the product range was extended by the production of cabinet pipes. The 50th anniversary of the headquarters in the Black Forest was celebrated in 1936. The workforce in Herford had grown to 50 employees. By bombs, on 24 November 1944, about 80 percent of the buildings and a large proportion of the machines were destroyed in Herford. In the last days of the war the company lost its boss Paul Hettich. The authorized signatory Alfred Günter continued the operation. After the war production in 1945 was resumed with 25 employees.

1992 saw the turnaround in the growth of the company, and a focus on core competency took place. The Heinze injection molding company and the company Koralle were sold. In 1994, a part of the production to the Czech Republic was relocated to a subsidiary founded there. In 1995 the company was restructured and became a holding company with independent, decentralized companies. In 15 countries over 4,000 employees worked for Hettich. It was followed by the founding of subsidiaries in Poland and Italy as well as the start of production in Russia. In 1996 the Brazilian company Plastipar Industria, now Hettich do Brazil, was purchased and integrated into the Hettich Group. In addition, a production facility was set up in China. In 2005, the logistics centre in Kirchlengern was put into operation. After 17 years 55% of the shares were in foreign hands, Anton Hettich together with his two sons Rainer and Andreas Hettich led the company back completely into the family possession in 2005.
