= Salome (software) =

Scientific computing environment

- Developers: CEA, EDF and Open Cascade
- Stable release: 9.16.0 (June 2026)
- Written in: C++, Python
- Operating system: Linux/Windows/Unix-like
- License: LGPL-2.1-or-later
- Website: www.salome-platform.org
- Repository: https://github.com/SalomePlatform/

SALOME is a multi-platform open source (LGPL-2.1-or-later) scientific computing environment, allowing the realization of industrial studies of physics simulations.

This platform, developed by a partnership between EDF and CEA, sets up an environment for the various stages of a study to be carried out: from the creation of the CAD model and the mesh to the post-processing and visualization of the results, including the sequence of calculation schemes. Other functionalities such as uncertainty treatment, data assimilation are also implemented.

SALOME does not contain a physics solver but it provides the computing environment necessary for their integration. The SALOME environment serves as a basis for the creation of disciplinary platforms, such as salome_meca (containing code_aster), SALOME_CFD (with code_saturne) and SALOME-HYDRO (with TELEMAC-MASCARET). In addition, the graphical user interface of the CATHARE thermal-hydraulic code, GUITHARE, is also based on the SALOME environment.

It is also possible to create tools for specific applications (for example civil engineering, fast dynamics in pipes or rotating machines, available in salome_meca) whose specialized graphical interfaces facilitate the performance of a study.

In addition to using SALOME through its graphical interface, most of the functionalities are available through a Python API. SALOME is available on its official website.

A SALOME Users’ Day takes place every year, featuring presentations on studies performed with SALOME in several application domains, either at EDF, CEA or elsewhere. The presentations of previous editions are available on the official website.

== History and consortium ==
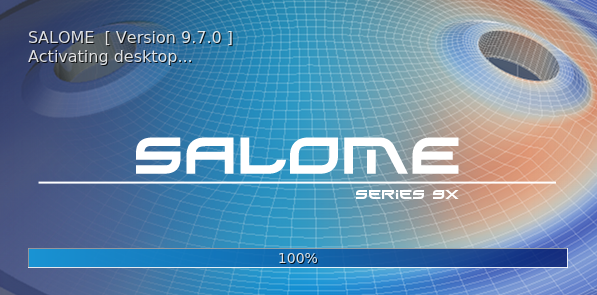
SALOME splash screen

The development of SALOME started around the year 2000 by a 9-sided partnership, including EDF, CEA and Open Cascade. The SALOME acronym means "Numerical Simulation by Computing Architecture in Open Source and with Evolving Methodology" (in French, « Simulation numérique par Architecture Logicielle en Open source et à Méthodologie d'Évolution »). Since 2020, the partnership focuses on industrial applications in the energy domain and is formed by EDF and CEA.

== The MED format ==
The MED format (Modèle d’Échange des Données in French, for Data Exchange Model) is a specialization of the HDF5 standard. It is jointly owned by EDF and CEA. MED is SALOME's data exchange model. The MED data model offers a standardized representation of meshes and result fields that is independent of the simulated physics. The MED library is developed in C and C++ and has an API in C, FORTRAN and Python.

== Available features ==
SALOME 9.7 module bar

SALOME offers many features, including an open source parametric CAD modeller, a multi-algorithm mesh generator/editor, a computational code supervisor, and other data analysis and processing tools.

Most of the modules are accessible both through the GUI and Python script. However, some modules remain dedicated to a purely scripted use (via python script). Here is the list of the available modules of SALOME 9.9 and that are also accessible via Python scripts :

- SHAPER: parametric and variational CAD generator of geometrical models for physics simulation in industrial domains, compatible with the STEP, IGES and BREP formats;
- GEOM: this component provides multiple functionalities for creating, viewing and modifying geometric CAD models.
- SMESH: mesh generator, compatible with the UNV, MED, STL, CGNS, SAUV and GMF formats, that contains the MeshGems suite (developed by the Distene company, under commercial license), the NetGen algorithms, mesh handling functionalities and mesh quality control operations;
- ParaViS: advanced scientific visualization module, based on the ParaView open source software developed by Kitware company;
- YACS: computation orchestration;
- JobManager: module for distant launching of jobs on cluster;
- EFICAS: data interface creator and dataset dynamic validation module;
- ADAO: data assimilation module;
- HOMARD: adaptive mesh generator by mesh element division following given criteria (zone, error criteria given by the physics computation, etc.);
- PERSALYS: graphical interface of OpenTURNS, which is the uncertainty treatment and statistical analysis module;

The modules only accessible in python are:

- MEDCoupling: mesh and field handling module, accessible through Python scripts only (without a graphical interface);
- Melissa: in-situ statistical data post-treatment module oriented to sensitivity studies, accessible through Python scripts only (without a graphical interface);

== Available versions ==
SALOME is available for several UNIX operating systems and Windows. All versions are available on the SALOME official website and the disciplinary platforms’ websites.
