= AxSTREAM =

Low pressure gas turbine for aircraft engine

AxSTREAM is a software suite designed by SoftInWay Inc. for the conceptual design of turbines and compressors and also thermodynamic calculations of existing turbomachinery on-design and off-design operation. The application area of the AxSTREAM software suite covers the design and redesign of turbomachinery, and educational fields.

AxSTREAM is used for:

- Axial turbines
- Axial compressors
- Radial turbines
- Centrifugal compressors
- Axial fans
- Blowers
- Axial-flow pumps
- Centrifugal Pumps
- Turbopumps

While creating a new design, AxSTREAM allows the user to start from initial inlet and outlet parameters, geometrical constraints, required mass flow rate (capacity) and rotational speed to perform preliminary design, 1D/2D calculation and optimization. Finally, it develops the complete flow path geometry including meridional shapes, profiles, and IGES model of each blade airfoil. As a multidisciplinary tool, AxSTREAM uses a simplified 1D structural module to check the design in the early phases during 1D/2D calculation and optimization. At the final stage of design, AxSTREAM performs 3D structural and vibration analysis to check the blade. It is also capable of producing a Campbell Diagram to show harmful frequencies to the system.

Mixed flow compressor designed with AxSTREAM

AxSTREAM includes a CFD module to perform 3D calculation of flow in interblade channels for both separate blade rows and the whole flow path.

During the optimization of new or existing flow paths, AxSTREAM enables the user:

- To change the geometry "manually" with the help of a user-friendly interface and further analysis in the 1D/2D solver and optimization using the existing infrastructure;
- To optimize the flow path using Design of Experiment methods (DoE).

While making thermodynamic calculations of the existing flow paths, AxSTREAM provides off-design operation characteristics and allows comparison with the experimental data.

One of AxSTREAM's features is high integration of all software components, which allows users to combine separate phases of design to create a single processing chain. Having designed a flow path, AxSTREAM can export the resulting geometry to CAD/CAE systems (e.g. UGS, Pro-E, SolidWorks, Fluent, AutoCAD, ANSYS CFX, NUMECA etc.).
