= ZWCAD =

Software application

- Developer: ZWSOFT
- Release: October 2000
- Operating system: Microsoft Windows; Linux (China only)
- Available in: >15 languages
- License: Proprietary software
- Website: www.zwsoft.com

ZWCAD (Chinese: 中望CAD) is a CAD software application. It is developed by ZWSOFT in Guangzhou, China. ZWCAD is a CAD software mainly for two-dimensional designing and is compatible with DWG files.

== Overview ==
ZWCAD is compatible with widely used 2D & 3D CAD drawing formats (such as DWG, DWT, DXF, DWF) and can directly read and save common graphics information. In addition, ZWCAD's interface and usage are similar to those of other 2D CAD software. ZWCAD can run on both Windows and Linux operating systems.

== Versions ==
There are various versions of ZWCAD, such as the following.

- ZWCAD Mechanical Edition: Based on ZWCAD, it adds special functions for mechanical design and is equipped with a standard parts library to simplify drawing work in the field of mechanical design.

In addition, ZWSoft has launched a mobile CAD application called " ZWCAD mobile", which supports basic functions such as browsing drawings and drawing modifications.
