= Computer-aided design =

Constructing product by means of computer

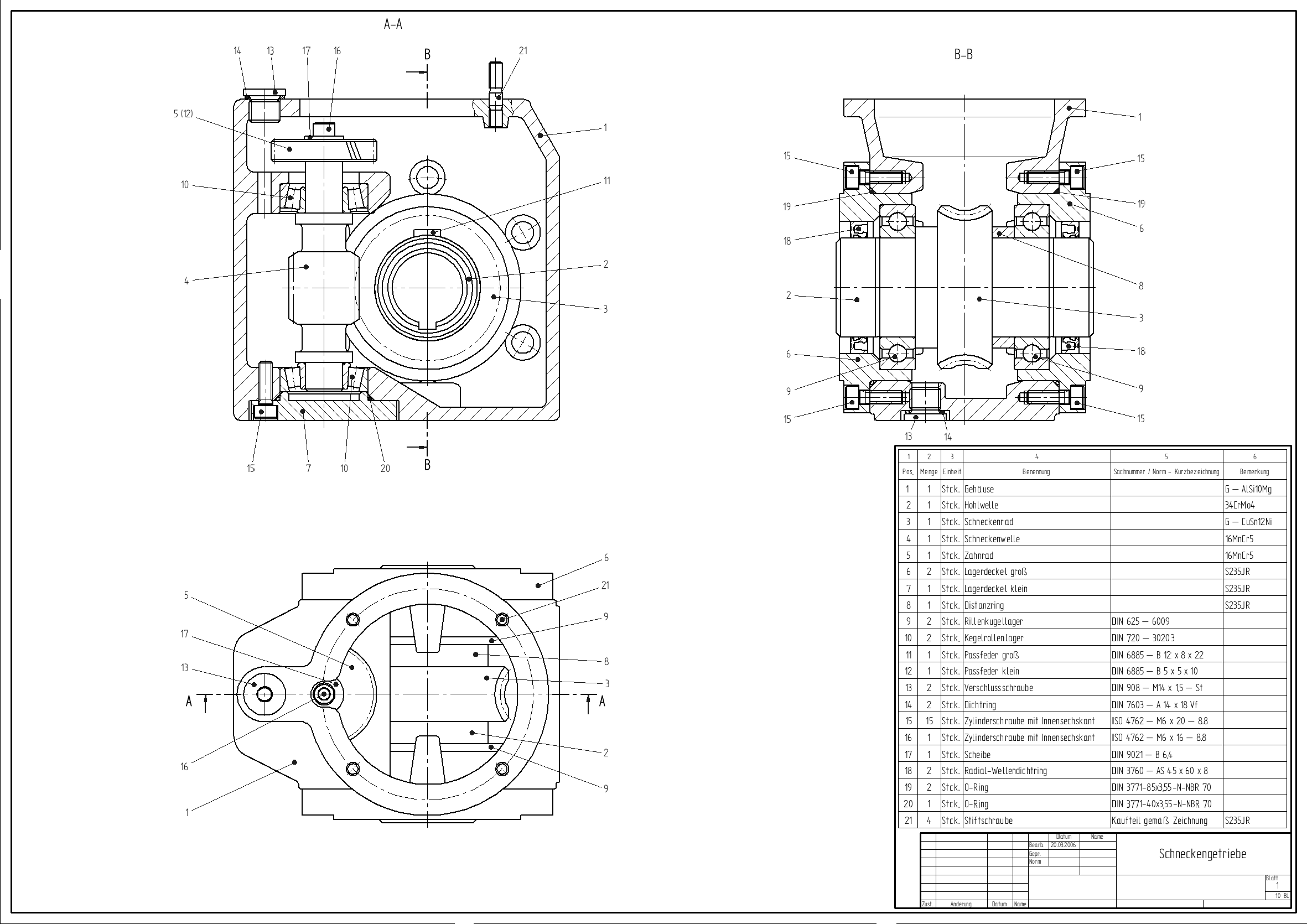
A 2D CAD drawing

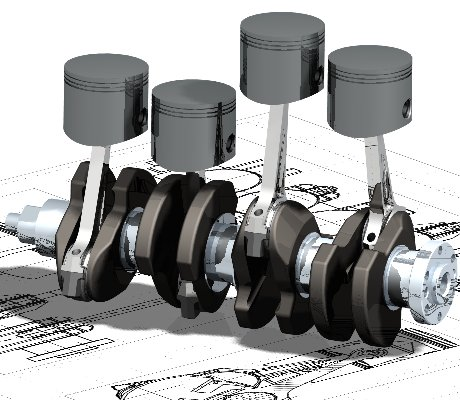
A 3D CAD model

Computer-aided design (CAD) is the use of computers (or workstations) to aid in the creation, modification, analysis, or optimization of a design. This software is used to increase the productivity of the designer, improve the quality of design, improve communications through documentation, and to create a database for manufacturing. Designs made through CAD software help protect products and inventions when used in patent applications. CAD output is often in the form of electronic files for print, machining, or other manufacturing operations. The terms computer-aided drafting (CAD) and computer-aided design and drafting (CADD) are also used.

Its use in designing electronic systems is known as electronic design automation (EDA). In mechanical design it is known as mechanical design automation (MDA), which includes the process of creating a technical drawing with the use of computer software.

CAD software for mechanical design uses either vector-based graphics to depict the objects of traditional drafting, or may also produce raster graphics showing the overall appearance of designed objects. However, it involves more than just shapes. As in the manual drafting of technical and engineering drawings, the output of CAD must convey information, such as materials, processes, dimensions, and tolerances, according to application-specific conventions.

CAD may be used to design curves and figures in two-dimensional (2D) space; or curves, surfaces, and solids in three-dimensional (3D) space.

CAD is an important industrial art extensively used in many applications, including automotive, shipbuilding, and aerospace industries, industrial and architectural design (building information modeling), prosthetics, and many more. CAD is also widely used to produce computer animation for special effects in movies, advertising and technical manuals, often called DCC digital content creation. The modern ubiquity and power of computers means that even perfume bottles and shampoo dispensers are designed using techniques unheard of by engineers of the 1960s. Because of its enormous economic importance, CAD has been a major driving force for research in computational geometry, computer graphics (both hardware and software), and discrete differential geometry.

The design of geometric models for object shapes, in particular, is occasionally called computer-aided geometric design (CAGD).

== Overview ==
Computer-aided design is one of the many tools used by engineers and designers and is used in many ways depending on the profession of the user and the type of software in question.

CAD is one part of the whole digital product development (DPD) activity within the product lifecycle management (PLM) processes, and as such is used together with other tools, which are either integrated modules or stand-alone products, such as:

- Computer-aided engineering (CAE) and finite element analysis (FEA, FEM)
- Computer-aided manufacturing (CAM) including instructions to computer numerical control (CNC) machines
- Photorealistic rendering and motion simulation
- Document management and revision control using product data management (PDM)

CAD is also used for the accurate creation of photo simulations that are often required in the preparation of environmental impact reports, in which computer-aided designs of intended buildings are superimposed into photographs of existing environments to represent what that locale will be like, where the proposed facilities are allowed to be built. Potential blockage of view corridors and shadow studies are also frequently analyzed through the use of CAD.

== Types ==
A simple procedure of recreating a solid model out of 2D sketches

There are several different types of CAD, each requiring the operator to think differently about how to use them and design their virtual components in a different manner. Virtually all of CAD tools rely on constraint concepts that are used to define geometric or non-geometric elements of a model.

=== 2D CAD ===
There are many producers of the lower-end 2D sketching systems, including a number of free and open-source programs. These provide an approach to the drawing process where scale and placement on the drawing sheet can easily be adjusted in the final draft as required, unlike in hand drafting.

=== 3D CAD ===
3D wireframe is an extension of 2D drafting into a three-dimensional space. Each line has to be manually inserted into the drawing. The final product has no mass properties associated with it and cannot have features directly added to it, such as holes. The operator approaches these in a similar fashion to the 2D systems, although many 3D systems allow using the wireframe model to make the final engineering drawing views.

3D "dumb" solids are created in a way analogous to manipulations of real-world objects. Basic three-dimensional geometric forms (e.g., prisms, cylinders, spheres, or rectangles) have solid volumes added or subtracted from them as if assembling or cutting real-world objects. Two-dimensional projected views can easily be generated from the models. Basic 3D solids do not usually include tools to easily allow the motion of the components, set their limits to their motion, or identify interference between components.

There are several types of 3D solid modeling

- Parametric modeling allows the operator to use what is referred to as "design intent". The objects and features are created modifiable. Any future modifications can be made by changing on how the original part was created. If a feature was intended to be located from the center of the part, the operator should locate it from the center of the model. The feature could be located using any geometric object already available in the part, but this random placement would defeat the design intent. If the operator designs the part as it functions, the parametric modeler is able to make changes to the part while maintaining geometric and functional relationships.
- Direct or explicit modeling provide the ability to edit geometry without a history tree. With direct modeling, once a sketch is used to create geometry it is incorporated into the new geometry, and the designer only has to modify the geometry afterward without needing the original sketch. As with parametric modeling, direct modeling has the ability to include the relationships between selected geometry (e.g., tangency, concentricity).
- Assembly modelling is a process which incorporates results of the previous single-part modelling into a final product containing several parts. Assemblies can be hierarchical, depending on the specific CAD software vendor, and highly complex models can be achieved (e.g. in building engineering by using computer-aided architectural design software)

==== Freeform CAD ====
Top-end CAD systems offer the capability to incorporate more organic, aesthetic and ergonomic features into the designs. Freeform surface modeling is often combined with solids to allow the designer to create products that fit the human form and visual requirements as well as they interface with the machine.

== Technology ==
A CAD model of a computer mouse

Today, CAD systems exist for all the major platforms (Windows, Linux, UNIX and Mac OS X); some packages support multiple platforms.

== Software ==
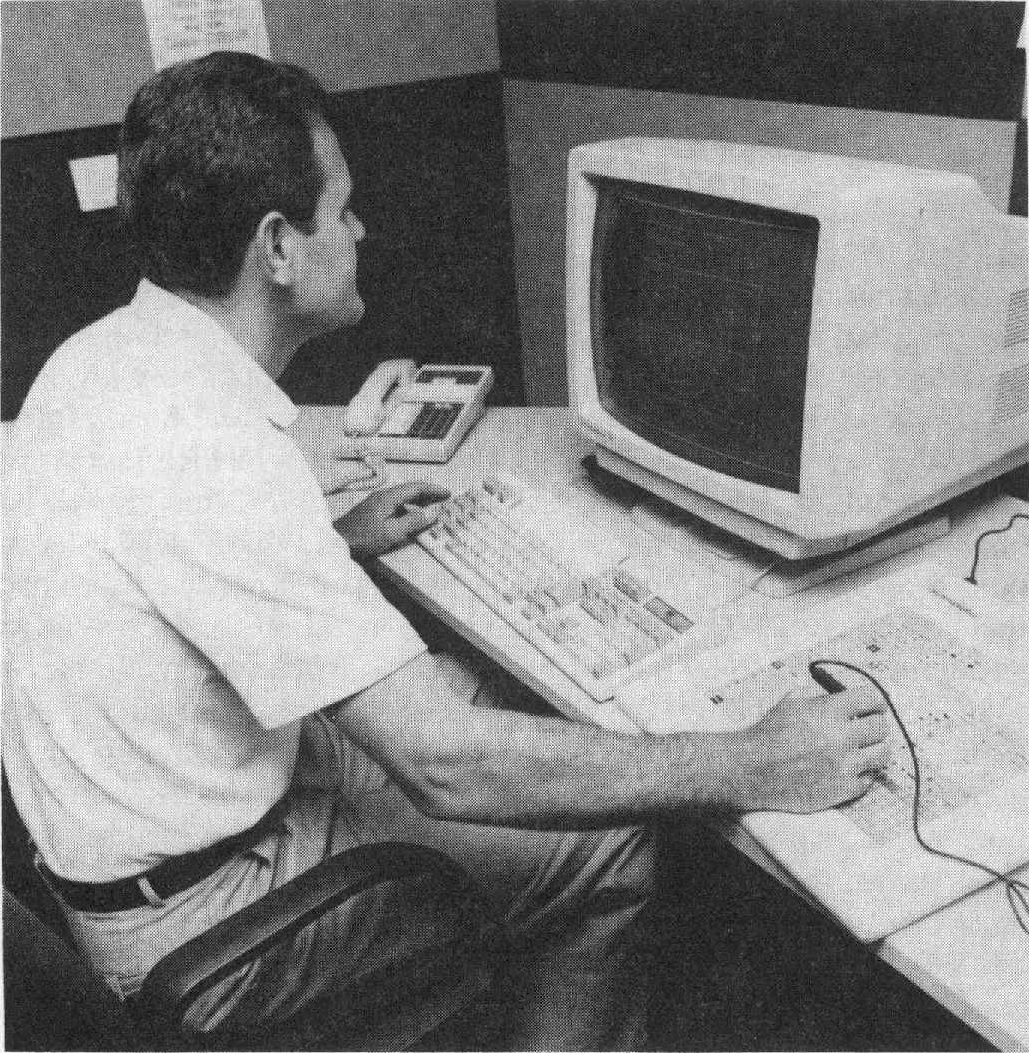
Drafter at work with CAD. (1992)

Starting with the IBM Drafting System in the mid-1960s, computer-aided design systems began to provide more capabilities than just an ability to reproduce manual drafting with electronic drafting, and the cost-benefit for companies to switch to CAD became apparent. The software automated many tasks that are taken for granted from computer systems today, such as automated generation of bills of materials, auto layout in integrated circuits, interference checking, and many others. Eventually, CAD provided the designer with the ability to perform engineering calculations. During this transition, calculations were still performed either by hand or by those individuals who could run computer programs. CAD was a revolutionary change in the engineering industry, where draftsman, designer, and engineer roles that had previously been separate began to merge. CAD is an example of the pervasive effect computers were beginning to have on the industry. Current computer-aided design software packages range from 2D vector-based drafting systems to 3D solid and surface modelers. Modern CAD packages can also frequently allow rotations in three dimensions, allowing viewing of a designed object from any desired angle, even from the inside looking out. Some CAD software is capable of dynamic mathematical modeling.

CAD technology is used in the design of tools and machinery and in the drafting and design of all types of buildings, from small residential types (houses) to the largest commercial and industrial structures (hospitals and factories).

CAD is mainly used for detailed design of 3D models or 2D drawings of physical components, but it is also used throughout the engineering process from conceptual design and layout of products, through strength and dynamic analysis of assemblies to definition of manufacturing methods of components. It can also be used to design objects such as jewelry, furniture, appliances, etc. Furthermore, many CAD applications now offer advanced rendering and animation capabilities so engineers can better visualize their product designs. 4D BIM is a type of virtual construction engineering simulation incorporating time or schedule-related information for project management.

CAD has become an especially important technology within the scope of computer-aided technologies, with benefits such as lower product development costs and a greatly shortened design cycle. CAD enables designers to layout and develop work on screen, print it out and save it for future editing, saving time on their drawings.

=== License management software ===
In the 2000s, some CAD system software vendors shipped their distributions with a dedicated license manager software that controlled how often or how many users can utilize the CAD system. It could run either on a local machine (by loading from a local storage device) or a local network fileserver and was usually tied to a specific IP address in latter case.

== List of software packages ==
CAD software enables engineers and architects to design, inspect and manage engineering projects within an integrated graphical user interface (GUI) on a personal computer system. Most applications support solid modeling with boundary representation (B-Rep) and NURBS geometry, and enable the same to be published in a variety of formats.

Based on market statistics, commercial software from Autodesk, Dassault Systèmes, Siemens PLM Software, and PTC dominate the CAD industry. The following is a list of major CAD applications, grouped by usage statistics.

=== Commercial software ===
- ABViewer
- AC3D
- Alibre Design
- ArchiCAD (Graphisoft)
- AutoCAD (Autodesk)
- AutoTURN
- AxSTREAM
- BricsCAD
- CATIA (Dassault Systèmes)
- Cobalt
- CorelCAD
- EAGLE
- Fusion 360 (Autodesk)
- IntelliCAD
- Inventor (Autodesk)
- IRONCAD
- KeyCreator (Kubotek)
- Landscape Express
- MEDUSA4
- MicroStation (Bentley Systems)
- Modelur (AgiliCity)
- Onshape (PTC)
- NX (Siemens Digital Industries Software)
- PTC Creo (successor to Pro/ENGINEER) (PTC)
- PunchCAD
- Remo 3D
- Revit (Autodesk)
- Rhinoceros 3D
- SketchUp
- Solid Edge (Siemens Digital Industries Software)
- SOLIDWORKS (Dassault Systèmes)
- SpaceClaim
- T-FLEX CAD
- TranslateCAD
- TurboCAD
- Vectorworks (Nemetschek)
- ZWCAD

=== Open-source software ===
- Blender
- BRL-CAD
- FreeCAD
- LibreCAD
- LeoCAD
- OpenSCAD
- QCAD
- Salome (software)
- SolveSpace

=== Freeware ===
- BricsCAD Shape
- Tinkercad (successor to Autodesk 123D)

=== CAD kernels ===
- ACIS by (Spatial Corp owned by Dassault Systèmes)
- C3D Toolkit by C3D Labs
- Open CASCADE Open Source
- Parasolid by (Siemens Digital Industries Software)
- ShapeManager by (Autodesk)

== See also ==
- 3D computer graphics – Graphics that use a three-dimensional representation of geometric data
- 3D printing – Additive process used to make a 3D object
- Additive Manufacturing File Format – Standard for describing objects for additive manufacturing
- Algorithmic art – Art genre
- CAD standards – Guidelines for the appearance of computer-aided design drawings
- CAD library - cloud based repository of 3D models or parts
- Coarse space (numerical analysis)
- Comparison of 3D computer graphics software
- Comparison of CAD, CAM, and CAE file viewers
- Comparison of computer-aided design software
- Comparison of EDA software – Electronic Device automation (electronic design automation)
- Computer-aided industrial design – Subset of computer-aided design
- Digital architecture – Architecture using digital technology
- Digital twin – Digital replica of a living or non-living physical entity
- Electronic design automation – Software for designing electronic systems
- Engineering optimization – Techniques for optimization
- Finite element method – Numerical method for solving physical or engineering problems
- Free-form select – Printmaking and design technique
- ISO 128 – International standard for technical drawings
- ISO 10303 – ISO standard (STEP)
- List of 3D rendering software
- List of computer-aided engineering software
- Model-based definition – Annotating computer-aided design models
- Molecular design software
- Open-source hardware – Hardware whose design source files are made available
- Rapid prototyping – Group of techniques to quickly construct physical objects
- Responsive computer-aided design – Approach to computer-aided design
- Space mapping – Design optimization methodology
- Surrogate model – Engineering model
- System integration – Bringing together component sub-systems into one system
- Timeline of early 3D computer graphics hardware – Timeline of early 3D graphics hardware
- Virtual prototyping – Computer-simulated prototype development
- Virtual reality – Computer-simulated experience
