= CAD data exchange =

Method of CAD drawing file translation

CAD data exchange is a method of drawing data exchange used to translate between different computer-aided design (CAD) authoring systems or between CAD and other downstream CAx systems.

Many companies use different CAD systems and exchange CAD data file format with suppliers, customers, and subcontractors. Such formats are often proprietary. Transfer of data is necessary so that, for example, one organization can be developing a CAD model, while another performs analysis work on the same model; at the same time a third organization is responsible for manufacturing the product.

Since the 1980s, a range of different CAD technologies have emerged. They differ in their application aims, user interfaces, performance levels, and in data structures and data file formats. For interoperability purposes a requirement of accuracy in the data exchange process is of paramount importance and robust exchange mechanisms are needed.

The exchange process targets primarily the geometric information of the CAD data but it can also target other aspects such as metadata, knowledge, manufacturing information, tolerances and assembly structure.

There are three options available for CAD data exchange: direct model translation, neutral file exchange and third-party translators.

== CAD data content ==
Although initially targeted for the geometric information (wire frame, surfaces, solids and drawings) of a product, nowadays there are other pieces of information that can be retrieved from a CAD file:

- Metadata – non-graphical attributes, e.g.:
  - part or detail numbers
  - author of the drawing
  - revision level, file path on the computer or network storage
  - system, the release information, etc.
- Design intent data – e.g. history trees, formulas, rules, guidelines
- Application data – e.g. Numerical Control tool paths, Geometric dimensioning and tolerancing (GD&T), process planning and assembly structure

The different types of product information targeted by the exchange process may vary throughout the life cycle of the product. At earlier stages of the design process, more emphasis is given to the geometric and design intent aspects of the data exchange while metadata and application data are more important at later stages of the product and process development.

== Data exchange options ==
There are at least three ways to exchange data between different CAD system: via a hardcopy or image (e.g. TIFF, GIF, JPEG, BMP or PCX, by way of image tracing), CAD-neutral formats or third-party CAD file translators between proprietary file formats. All have their advantages and disadvantages and may be error-prone.

=== Direct model translation ===
Direct data translators provide a direct solution which entails translating the data stored in a product database directly from one CAD system format to another, usually in one step. There usually exists a neutral database in a direct data translator. The structure of the neutral database must be general, governed by the minimum required definitions of any of the modelling data types, and be independent of any vendor format. Major CAD systems, such as SolidWorks, PTC Creo, Siemens NX and CATIA can directly read and/or write other CAD formats, simply by using File Open and File Save As options. This option is limited by the fact that most CAD formats are proprietary therefore direct translators are typically unidirectional, partially functional and not standardized.

=== Neutral file exchange ===
Neutral file exchange uses an intermediary neutral format to translate data between CAD systems. This method starts from a pre-processor embedded in the original CAD system, which generates the neutral file from the originating CAD format. The target CAD system post-processes the neutral file and converts it into the target native format. Some neutral formats are defined by standards organizations such as IGES and STEP while others are proprietary but still widely used and are regarded as quasi industry standards.

==== Neutral formats ====
DXF (Drawing eXchange Format)
Developed by Autodesk in 1982 as their data interoperability solution between AutoCAD and other CAD systems. The DXF is primarily 2D-based and its format is a tagged data representation of all the information contained in an AutoCAD drawing file, which means that each data element in the file is preceded by an integer number that is called a group code indicating the type of following data element. As most commercial application software developers have chosen to support Autodesk's native DWG as the format for AutoCAD data interoperability, DXF has become less useful.
VDA-FS (Verband der Automobilindustrie – Flächenschnittstelle)
Created by the German Association of the Automotive Industry in 1982 as an interoperability method for free-form surfaces. This format differs from other formats in that it only supports the communication of free-form curve and surface data with associated comments, but no other geometric or non-geometric entities. Therefore, it is limited to representations by parametric polynomials, but this covers the great majority of free-form CAD systems. It includes Bézier, B-Spline and Coons tensor product types of surfaces and corresponding curves. The VDA-FS specification is released in the German Industrial Standard DIN 66301.
PDES (Product Data Exchange Specification)
Originated in 1988 under the Product Definition Data Interface (PDDI) study done by McDonnell Aircraft Corporation on behalf of the U.S. Air Force. PDES was designed to completely define a product for all applications over its expected life cycle, including geometry, topology, tolerances, relationships, attributes, and features necessary to completely define a part or assembly of parts. PDES can be viewed as an expansion of IGES where organizational and technological data have been added. In fact, the later PDES contained IGES. The development of PDES under the guidance of the IGES organization and in close collaboration with the International Organization for Standardization (ISO) led to the birth of STEP.
STEP (ISO 10303 – STandard for the Exchange of Product model data)
The work with the ISO 10303 standard was initiated in 1984 and initially published in 1994, with the objective to standardize the exchange of product data between PLM systems. It is a very comprehensive set of specifications covering many different product types and many life cycle phases. STEP uses the neutral ISO 10303-11 format, also known as an EXPRESS schema. EXPRESS defines not only the data types but also relations and rules applying to them. STEP supports data exchange, data sharing and data archiving. For data exchange, STEP defines the transitory form of the product data that is to be transferred between a pair of applications. It supports data sharing by providing access to and operation on a single copy of the same product data by more than one application, potentially simultaneously. STEP may also be used to support the development of the archive product data itself. STEP consists of several hundred documents called parts. Every year new parts are added or new revisions of older parts are released. This makes STEP the biggest standard within ISO. The 200-series parts STEP are called Application Protocols (AP), with the specific parts directly related to CAD systems:

  - 203 (Configuration controlled 3D designs of mechanical parts and assemblies) – Mainly used for 3D design and product structure. A subset of AP214 but most widely used.
  - 210 (Electronic assembly, interconnect and packaging design) – CAD systems for printed circuit board.
  - 212 (Electrotechnical design and installation) – CAD systems for electrical installation and cable harness.
  - 214 (Core data for automotive mechanical design processes) – How STEP is represented in a text file for interchange.
  - 238 (STEP-NC Application interpreted model for computerized numerical controllers) – CAD, CAM, and CNC machining process information.
  - 242 (Managed model based 3D engineering) – the merging of the two leading STEP application protocols, AP 203 and AP 214.

Parasolid XT
Part of the Parasolid geometric modeling kernel originally developed by Shape Data and currently owned by Siemens Digital Industries Software. Parasolid can represent wireframe, surface, solid, cellular and general non-manifold models. It stores topological and geometric information defining the shape of models in transmitting files. These files have a published format so that applications can have access to Parasolid models without necessarily using the Parasolid kernel. Parasolid is capable of accepting data from other modeler formats. Its unique tolerant modeling functionality can accommodate and compensate for less accurate data.

IGES (Initial Graphics Exchange Specification)
An outdated format originated in late 1979 and initially published by the American National Standards Institute (ANSI) in 1980 preceding the large-scale deployment of the CAD technology in the industry. This file format considers the product definition as a file of entities, with each entity being represented in an application-independent format. After the initial release of STEP (ISO 10303) in 1994, interest in further development of IGES declined, and Version 5.3 (1996) was the last published standard.

=== Third-party translators ===
Several companies specialize in CAD data translation software that can read from one CAD system and write the information in another CAD system format. There are a handful of companies that provide low-level software toolkits to directly read and write the major CAD file formats. Most CAD developers license these toolkits, to add import and export capabilities to their products. There are also a significant number of companies that use the low-level translation toolkits as the basis for building standalone end-user translation and validation applications. These systems have their own proprietary intermediate format some of which will allow reviewing the data during translation. Some of these translators work stand-alone while others require one or both of the CAD packages installed on the translation machine as they use code (APIs) from these systems to read/write the data. Some companies also use these low-level toolkits to create import or export plug-ins for other CAD applications.

==== List of software toolkits for developers ====
- Datakit CrossCad/Ware: SDK to read and write CAD formats.

==== List of standalone end-user translation applications ====
- Datakit CrossManager: Multi formats CAD translator.
- PolyTrans|CAD: Multi formats CAD translator.
- Transmagic: Multi formats CAD translator.

==== List of plug-ins for CAD applications ====
- Datakit CrossCad/Plg: Import and export plug-ins for Rhino, SOLIDWORKS, ...
- PolyTrans|CAD: Import/export plug-ins for 3ds Max, Maya, CADMATIC and Visual Components.
- Power translators: Import plug-ins for 3dsMax.

== Data exchange quality ==
Data quality can be addressed intrinsically and extrinsically. Intrinsic problems are those related to the CAD model’s structure before any translation process begins, while extrinsic problems relate to those issues appearing during translation. The development of STEP is the best solution to solve the extrinsic problems, extending its current capabilities to support 2-D parametric sections, 3-D parametric assemblies, and history-based modeling. Product data quality is a key issue to avoid intrinsic data exchange problems and simplify the integration of downstream applications in the design chain.

As each CAD system has its own method of describing geometry, both mathematically and structurally, there is always some loss of information when translating data from one CAD data format to another. One example is when the translation occurs between CAD systems using different geometric modeling kernels, in which the translation inconsistencies can lead to anomalies in the data. The intermediate file formats are also limited in what they can describe, and they can be interpreted differently by both the sending and receiving systems. It is, therefore, important when transferring data between systems to identify what needs to be translated. If only the 3D model is required for the downstream process, then only the model description needs to be transferred. However, there are levels of detail. For example: is the data wireframe, surface, or solid; is the topology (BREP) information required; must the face and edge identifications be preserved on subsequent modification; must the feature information and history be preserved between systems; and is PMI annotation to be transferred. With product models, retaining the assembly structure may be required. If drawings need to be translated, the wireframe geometry is normally not an issue; however text, dimensions and other annotation can be an issue, particularly fonts and formats. No matter what data is to be translated, there is also a need to preserve attributes (such as color and layer of graphical objects) and metadata stored within the files.

Some translation methods are more successful than others at translating data between CAD systems. Native formats offer the simple translation of 3D solids, but even so there are few pitfalls to watch out for. If two CAD systems use different representations for one type of geometry at some point the representation must be converted or even discarded, regardless of the type of translation. Modern Neutral formats are designed to solve this problem. Old neutral formats like IGES can have some translation issues like loss of the original color of the parts, or incorrect position of bodies. This is no longer the case with modern standards like STEP AP242, which embeds Validation Properties. Validation Properties are key characteristics of the model (Center of Gravity of a solid, wet area of a surface, PMI characteristics or even check points on a shape), stored by the emitting system and checked by the receiving system. This allows to control the quality of the imported data. Quality of exchange using STEP is so important that regular benchmarks are run by independent associations (AFNeT, PDES, inc., ProSTEP iViP) to check exchanges between various CAD and PLM systems.

Some CAD systems have functionalities to compare geometry of two models. So, user can compare the model before and after translation from one CAD to another one to estimate quality of the translation, and to fix found defects. But often such functionalities can compare only tessellations of two models. It is really hard algorithmic problem to compare topological elements of two 3D models and restore their associativity to show groups of modified faces, because there are very different representation of geometry data in different CAD systems, but sometimes it is possible. For instance, the component LEDAS Geometry Comparison based on C3D kernel can be integrated in CAD system (like Autodesk Inventor,) to compare 3D models and pinpoint all of the differences between them.

== MultiCAD Digital Mockups ==
Two CAD/CAM/CAE PLM trends have been driving CAD Data Exchange technology. One is the need for close interaction throughout today’s extended multiCAD enterprises. The other is the increased reliance on digital mockups to permit visualization, design in context, simulation and analysis of large scale assemblies prior to the actual manufacture of the physical product. Ongoing advances in data exchange technology have enabled significant fulfillment of those needs.

The ability to visualize medium if not large scale assemblies was one of the early successes of these CAD translation formats. Hardware improvements and the development of lightweight formats supported larger scale assemblies.

Current advances now allow an “Active Mockup.” This technology allows design in context with simulations such as dynamic clearance analysis and automatic generation of motion envelopes. Active mockups allow the edit of components from directly within the multi-CAD assembly. Multiple level-of-detail displays support interactive performance even in huge assemblies.

== CAD to CAM Data Exchange ==
NC programming typically requires that the geometry received from a CAD system, whether in wireframe, surface, solid or combined formats, be free from any irregularities and inconsistencies that may have occurred in the CAD phase of geometry creation. Data exchange from CAD to CAM must therefore include tools for identifying and repairing those inconsistencies. These tools are typically included in the data exchange software of each CAM solution-set.

In a true PLM environment, CAD to CAM data exchange must provide for more than the transfer of geometry. Product Manufacturing Information, whether generated by the designer for use by manufacturing, or generated by the manufacturing organization for use by design, must be a part of the data exchange system. STEP-NC was designed to carry GD&T and other PMI through CAD and CAM into a CNC.

== See also ==
- Comparison of CAD, CAM, and CAE file viewers
