= VDA =

VDA may refer to:

== Science and technology ==
- /dev/vda would be a paravirtualized hard disk device when using VirtIO
- VDA-FS, CAD data exchange format
- Vascular disrupting agent, a class of pharmaceutical drugs
- Video data analysis, a technique for behavioural analysis
- Video distribution amplifier

== Organizations ==
- Verband der Automobilindustrie, a special interest group representing the German automobile industry
  - VDA 6.1, one of their quality management system standards
- Verein für Deutsche Kulturbeziehungen im Ausland, a German cultural organisation

== Other ==
- Ovda Airport, Eilat, Israel, by IATA code
- Vereda, Subdivisional administrative part of a municipality in Colombia.
- Villa Dolores Airport, serving Villa Dolores, Córdoba, Argentina
- Voluntary disclosure agreement, a program in United States taxation
- Viewer discretion advised, in the context of television content rating systems
