= List of STEP (ISO 10303) parts =

An incomplete list of parts making up STEP (ISO 10303):

== Descriptions methods ==
- Part 1 - Overview and fundamental principles (1994). Unfortunately outdated, not covering the role of AICs and modules.
- Part 11 - EXPRESS language reference manual
- Part 12 - EXPRESS -I language reference manual (withdrawn)
- Part 14 - EXPRESS -X language reference manual

== Implementation methods ==
- Part 15 - SysML XMI to XSD transformation
- Part 21 - STEP-File Clear text encoding of the exchange structure
- Part 22 - SDAI Standard data access interface specification
- Part 23 - C++ language binding of the standard data access interface
- Part 24 - C language binding of the standard data access interface
- Part 25 - EXPRESS to OMG XMI binding
- Part 26 - Binary representation of EXPRESS-driven data using HDF5
- Part 27 - Java TM programming language binding to the standard data access interface with Internet/Intranet extensions
- Part 28 - STEP-XML XML representation for EXPRESS-driven data

== Conformance testing methodology and framework ==
- Part 31 - General concepts
- Part 32 - Requirements on testing laboratories and clients
- Part 34 - Abstract test methods for application protocol implementations
- Part 35 - Abstract test methods for SDAI implementations

== Integrated generic resources ==
- Part 41 - Fundamentals of product description and support
- Part 42 - Geometric and topological representation
- Part 43 - Representation structures
- Part 44 - Product structure configuration
- Part 45 - Materials
- Part 46 - Visual presentation: Works in combination with part42 and allows to specify how to display 2D or 3D geometric models together with annotation data. The original design intend was that data according to this part could be displayed by computer systems supporting the Graphical Kernel System or PHIGS. Today other display interfaces such as OpenGL for 3D and Java 2D are more appropriate to display part 46 based data.
- Part 47 - Shape variation tolerances: This part supports the representation of Geometric dimensioning and tolerancing principles for computer sensitive data exchange. But it does not cover how to present the data for humans.
- Part 49 - Process structures and properties
- Part 50 - Mathematical constructs
- Part 51 - Mathematical description
- Part 52 - Mesh-based topology
- Part 53 - Numerical analysis
- Part 54 - Classification and set theory
- Part 55 - Procedural and hybrid representation
- Part 56 - State
- Part 57 - Expression extensions
- Part 58 - Risk
- Part 59 - Quality of product shape data
- Part 61 - Systems engineering representation

== Integrated application resources ==
- Part 101 - Draughting
- Part 104 - Finite element analysis
- Part 105 - Kinematics
- Part 107 - Finite element analysis definition relationships
- Part 108 - Parameterization and constraints for explicit geometric product models
- Part 109 - STEP assembly model for products
- Part 110 - Computational fluid dynamics data
- Part 111 - Elements for the procedural modelling of solid shapes
- Part 112 - Standard modelling commands for the procedural exchange of 2D CAD models

== Application Protocol ==
The 'APs' utilize the lower-level information of integrated resources in well defined combinations and configurations to represent a particular data model of an engineering or technical application.

- Part 201 - Explicit draughting. Simple 2D drawing geometry related to a product. No association, no assembly hierarchy. Practically a subset of AP202 and 214.
- Part 202 - Associative draughting. 2D/3D drawing with association, but no product structure. Practically a subset of AP214.
- Part 203: Configuration controlled 3D designs of mechanical parts and assemblies. Mainly used for 3D design and product structure. A subset of AP214 but most widely used.
- Part 204 - Mechanical design using boundary representation
- Part 207 - Sheet metal die planning and design
- Part 209 - Composite and metallic structural analysis and related design
- Part 210 - Electronic assembly, interconnect and packaging design. The most complex and sophisticated STEP AP.
- Part 212 - Electrotechnical design and installation. Designed as a complement for AP214, but not fully harmonized with it.
- Part 214 - Core data for automotive mechanical design processes
- Part 215 - Ship arrangement
- Part 216 - Ship moulded forms
- Part 218 - Ship structures
- Part 219 - Dimensional inspection information exchange
- Part 221 - Functional data and their schematic representation for process plant
- Part 223 - Exchange of design and manufacturing product information for cast parts, currently on CD level
- Part 224 - Mechanical product definition for process plans using machining features
- Part 225 - Building elements using explicit shape representation
- Part 227 - Plant spatial configuration
- Part 232 - Technical data packaging core information and exchange
- Part 233 - Systems engineering
- Part 235 - Materials information for the design and verification of products
- Part 236 - Furniture catalog and interior design
- Part 237 - Fluid dynamics
- Part 238 - STEP-NC Application interpreted model for computerized numerical controllers
- Part 239 - Product life cycle support
- Part 240 - Process plans for machined products
- Part 242 - Managed model-based 3D engineering
- Part 243 - Modelling and Simulation information in a collaborative Systems Engineering Context (MoSSEC)

== ATS - Abstract test suite ==
An ATS is a formal description on how to test STEP implementations for conformance. They contain a test plan for postprocessors (exporting STEP data) and preprocessors (importing STEP data). The structure of an ATS is defined in part 34.

The original plan of STEP was to have for every AP 2xx a corresponding ATS 3xx, but only a few were finally realized till today.

- Part 304 - Abstract test suite: Mechanical design using boundary representation
- Part 307 - Abstract test suite: Sheet metal die planning and design

== AIC - Application interpreted constructs ==
AICs are specializations of the integrated application and generic resources. This is done by subtyping interfaced entities and adding further constraints and rules. No new stand-alone entities are created and no new explicit attributes are added. Most AICs are specializations in the geometric area. AICs did not exist back in 1994 when the first release of STEP got published. But when the 2nd generation of APs grows up it becomes clear that APs do not only share not only the IRs but also a lot of specializations. AICs are a big step towards AP interoperability.

- Part 501 - Edge-based wireframe
- Part 502 - Shell-based wireframe
- Part 503 - Geometrically bounded 2D wireframe
- Part 504 - Draughting annotation
- Part 505 - Drawing structure and administration
- Part 506 - Draughting elements
- Part 507 - Geometrically bounded surface
- Part 508 - Non-manifold surface
- Part 509 - Manifold surface
- Part 510 - Geometrically bounded wireframe
- Part 511 - Topologically bounded surface
- Part 512 - Faceted boundary representation
- Part 513 - Elementary boundary representation
- Part 514 - Advanced boundary representation
- Part 515 - Constructive solid geometry
- Part 517 - Mechanical design geometric presentation
- Part 518 - Mechanical design shaded representation
- Part 519 - Geometric tolerances
- Part 520 - Associative draughting elements
- Part 521 - Manifold subsurface
- Part 522 - Machining features
- Part 523 - Curve swept solid
