= Tebis =

Software product

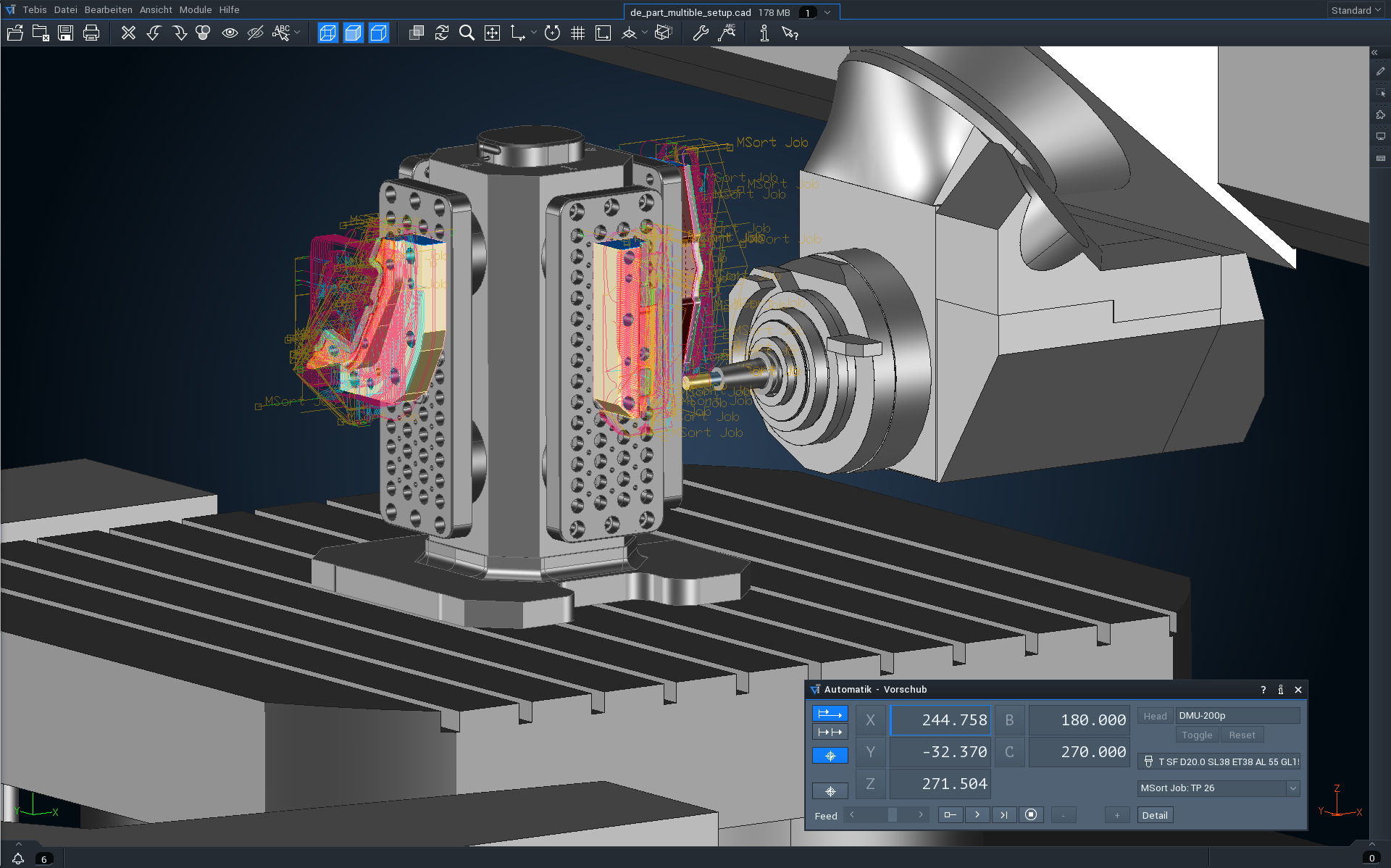
- Developer: Tebis Technische Informationssysteme AG
- Stable release: V4.1 Release 8 / June 2024
- Operating system: Windows, HP-UX
- Available in: German; English; French; Italian; Spanish; Portuguese; Swedish; Czech; Chinese; Japanese; Russian; Polish
- Type: CAD, CAM
- License: commercial
- Website: www.tebis.com

Tebis (Technische Entwicklung Beratung und Individuelle Software) is a CAD/CAM software provided by Tebis AG, with headquarters in Martinsried near Munich/Germany. Development locations: Martinsried and Norderstedt, Germany International locations: China, Spain, France, Italy, Portugal, Sweden, United Kingdom, USA.

== Facts and figures ==
- Founded: 1984 (Tebis GmbH)
- Change of corporate form: 1991 (Tebis AG)
- Headquarters: Martinsried near Munich, Bavaria (Germany)
- Employees: >350 worldwide

== Functionality ==
Tebis is a CAD/CAM software for industries such as die, mold or model manufacturing. The software is primarily to create toolpaths for machining operations such as drilling, milling and turning, but also for Wire EDM and sinker EDM. These toolpaths control multi-axis CNC machines. Other applications include manufacturing planning, design, reverse engineering, quality assurance, CNC machining and assembly. The software features interfaces for neutral file formats as well as proprietary formats of third-party manufacturers (STEP 203/214, VDAFS, IGES, DXF, STL, Parasolid, Catia V4/V5, Creo, SolidWorks, NX, JT, Inventor, Nastran, AutoForm).

== Industrial application ==
The programs are used in manufacturing companies of all sizes, from small and medium-sized companies to OEMs in the automotive and aerospace industries and their suppliers. The following is a small sampling of companies who use the CAM system from Tebis.

Company	Business
Bertrandt	Automotive supplier
BMW Group	Automotive industry
Daimler AG	Automotive industry
Ford	Automotive industry
Gestamp	Automotive supplier
Goodrich	Aerospace manufacturer
Great Wall Motor Company Ltd.	Automotive industry
Hella	Automotive supplier
Honda	Automotive industry
Porsche	Automotive industry
Procostamp S.n.c.	Manufacturing industry
Secondo Mona	Supplier aerospace
Tesla Inc.	Automotive industry
ThyssenKrupp	Automotive supplier
Toyota	Automotive industry
UTC Aerospace Systems	Supplier aerospace
Volkswagen AG	Automotive industry

== The history of Tebis ==
Tebis was founded in 1984. Following initial consulting jobs and business software projects, Tebis shifted its focus after six months to CAD/CAM. The first technical product was a PC-based station, which used a drawing board equipped with a position-measuring system to digitize transparent plans and convert them to scribed programs for milling machines.

Version 1.0 was the first Tebis CAD/CAM system, exclusively for MS-DOS. Two monitors were required: One monitor displayed the real commands, while the other showed the geometries in 4 panels. The input commands were entered using a digitizer tablet. The milling programs were calculated only for individual surfaces. Because of the small RAM (256 bytes) in the NC machines of the 1980s, Tebis provided a DNC connection to enable postprocessing via a V24 line next to the NC machine.

Tebis Version 2.0 with a graphical user interface was introduced in 1989. It is still used today in a much more advanced form, and is distinct from common Windows interfaces. This version made it possible to animate geometries onscreen in real-time. Tebis Automill technology, which allows users to calculate milling paths across surfaces, was introduced in Version 2.1.

Tebis Version 3.0 was presented in 1993. The system was modularized and expanded for operation under the SCO UNIX, HP-UX, IRIX and AIX operating systems. Version 3.1 included the Milling Wizard, version V3.2 featured interactive CAD and version V3.3 offered the first integration of a tool library and parameterized administration for all NC calculations. In Version 3.4, modules for the simulation of machining at a virtual CNC machine the design of electrodes for EDM, and 2.5D milling and drilling were added. Starting with Version 3.5, variable machining templates can be used for even better NC programming automation. For the first time this version also included the Job Manager as a central control element for all machining steps. The CAD module for BREP design was integrated in the software, enabling Tebis to be used for the entire manufacturing process in die, mold and model manufacturing. Version 4.0 was provided with a new user interface specifically designed for CAD/CAM applications and a new platform for 2.5D and 3D feature-based NC automation. For the first time, this version supported CNC lathes and industrial robots, and the manufacturing technologies of laser hardening and laser weld cladding.

The current Tebis Version 4.1 was launched in 2020 with an internally-developed parametric-associative CAD system base. The hybrid CAD system combines free-form surfaces, solids and digitized data and provides Tebis template technology also in the CAD environment. Parametric CAD templates automate design and CAD manufacturing preparation. The user interface has also been optimized in terms of simplicity and automation for CAM users.

Tebis is one of the global market leaders in CAM software. The owner-managed company also has its own consulting unit working with companies primarily in die, mold and model manufacturing. Services include industry-specific process and management consulting and optimizing the processes of these companies.

After acquiring a division of ID Ingenieurgesellschaft für Datentechnik mbH, Tebis now also offers a manufacturing execution system (MES) called ProLeiS that can be integrated in the CAD/CAM application.
