= ENX (disambiguation) =

ENX may refer to:

- ENX Association, an association of European vehicle manufacturers
- ISO 639:enx, the ISO 639 code for the Enxet language
- Euronext, the Euronext Paris code ENX
