= ISO 10303-22 =

ISO standard

ISO 10303-22 is a part of the implementation methods of STEP with the official title Standard data access interface or simply SDAI.

SDAI defines an abstract Application Programming Interface (API) to work on application data according to a given data models defined in EXPRESS. SDAI itself is defined independent of a particular programming language. Language bindings exist for

- Part 23 - C++ language binding of the standard data access interface
- Part 24 - C binding of the standard data access interface
- Part 27 - Java binding to the standard data access interface with Internet/Intranet extensions
- The development of language bindings for FORTRAN and the interface definition language (IDL) of CORBA were canceled.

The original intent of SDAI and its bindings to programming languages was to achieve portability of software applications from one implementation to another. This was soon abandoned because there were only a few commercial implementations and they differed significantly in their detailed APIs. Today the term SDAI is sometimes used for many types of APIs supporting STEP, even if they only partially follow the strict functionality as defined in ISO 10303-22 and its implementation methods, or not at all. Part 35 of STEP (Abstract test methods for SDAI implementations) provides a formal way how to prove the conformance of an implementation with SDAI.

The main components of SDAI are:

- SDAI dictionary schema, a meta level EXPRESS schema to describe EXPRESS schemas
- Managing objects
  - SDAI session to control the whole SDAI environment for a single user/thread including optional transaction control
  - SDAI repository the physical (typically) container to store SDAI models and Schema instances, e.g. a database
  - SDAI model a subdivision of an SDAI repository, containing entity instance according to a particular EXPRESS schema
  - Schema instance a logical grouping of one or several SDAI models, making up a valid population according to a particular EXPRESS schema
- Operations
  - to deal with the managing objects
  - to create, delete and modify application data (entity instance, attribute values, aggregates and their members)
  - to validate application data according to all the constraints and rules specified in EXPRESS

== Major software vendors for SDAI and similar STEP-APIs ==
- Eurostep
- Jotne Connect AS
- LKSoftWare GmbH / JSDAI
- Open Design Alliance STEP SDK Open Design Alliance STEP SDK
- PDTec AG: The Ecco Toolkit provides implementation of ISO 10303-11, -14, -21, -28.
- STEP Tools, Inc

== Open-source implementations of SDAI ==
The NIST STEP Class Library is a public domain implementation of ISO 10303-21(ASCII data exchange files), -22(SDAI), -23 (C++ SDAI binding) using ISO 10303-11:1994. The development of the NIST STEP Class Library has been stopped in the late 1990s. STEPcode (formerly STEP Class Library) has been improved by the BRL-CAD developers on github under the BSD license. STEPcode also has an experimental Python binding.

JSDAI is a complete implementation of ISO 10303-22(SDAI) and ISO 10303-27(Java SDAI binding) under the Open Source license AGPL.

== See also ==
- List of STEP (ISO 10303) parts
- JSDAI
