= VDA 6.1 =

Automobile quality management system standard

VDA 6.1 is a German quality management system standard. It was initiated by the automobile industry. The first VDA standard was for the exchange of surface models, and was named "VDA-FS". It has been superseded along the way, by a subset of the "Initial Graphics Exchange Specification" (IGES); referred to, simply, as "VDA". Aside from this exchange standard, VDA also developed "VDA-PS", a library standard for standard parts, now known as "DIN 66304".

Based on ISO 9001:1994, the quality management system includes all elements of QS-9000, with an additional four requirements specific to VDA 6.1 as follows:

- Element 06.3 on "Recognition of Product Risk": This the risk of the product, failing to fulfil its stipulated function, and its effect on the whole assembly.
- Element Z1.5 on "Employee Satisfaction": This covers the perception of the company employees, as well as their needs and expectations, that will be met through the company's quality system.
- Element 07.3 on "Quotation Structure": A customer or market is offered products for purchase or made available to own or to use.
- Element 12.4 on "Quality History": This section covers the quality history of customer-supplied products and gives an overview of the situation during a particular period.

The VDA standard is broken into two parts:

- Management
- Products and Processes.

Any company seeking certification must achieve at least 90 percent compliance in a formal quality audit.

Sanctioned interpretations of VDA 6.1 are available, clarifying some of the elements, so as to assist companies and registrars to understand the requirements better. There are also a number of other manuals, which must be read in conjunction with the VDA 6.1 manual, and is aimed at facilitating better understanding of what is required.

More elaborated versions of this standard are VDA 6.2 and VDA 6.4.

== See also ==
- Verband der Automobilindustrie
