= ISO 13584 =

ISO standard regarding industrial automation systems and integration

The official title of ISO 13584 is Industrial automation systems and integration - Parts library, with the acronym PLIB. PLIB is developed and maintained by the ISO technical committee TC 184, Technical Industrial automation systems and integration, sub-committee SC4 Industrial data. See also ISO 10303.

PLIB consists of these parts:

- ISO 13584–1, Overview and fundamental principles: Overview and fundamental principles
- Logical resources
  - ISO 13584–20, Logical model of expressions
  - ISO 13584–24, Logical model of a supplier library
  - ISO 13584–25, Logical model of supplier library with aggregate values and explicit content
  - ISO 13584–26, Information supplier identification
- Implementation resources
  - ISO 13584–31, Geometric programming interface. This part defines a Fortran API for the creation of product geometry. It is derived from the German VDA API DIN 66304
  - ISO 13584–32, Implementation resources: OntoML: Ontology Markup Language. This part specifies an XML based exchange structure of ISO 13584-25 compliant data. It provides for exchanging: (1) ontologies/reference dictionaries compliant with the common ISO13584/IEC61360 dictionary model, and (2) libraries of product compliant with ISO13584-25.
  - ISO 13584–35, Implementation resources: Spreadsheet interface for parts library. This part specifies a spreadsheet based exchange structure of ISO 13584-25 compliant data.
- Description methodology
  - ISO 13584–42, Methodology for structuring part families
- Others
  - ISO 13584–101, Geometrical view exchange protocol by parametric program
  - ISO 13584–102, View exchange protocol by ISO 10303 conforming specification
  - ISO 13584–501, Reference dictionary for measuring instruments -- Registration procedure
  - ISO 13584–511, Mechanical systems and components for general use -- Reference dictionary for fasteners

PLIB and IEC 61360 Component Data Dictionary are using the same datamodel.
