= ISO 10303-28 =

Specification for the use of XML to express to represent EXPRESS schema

For product and manufacturing information, STEP-XML is a short term for ISO 10303-28, Industrial automation systems and integration—Product data representation and exchange—Part 28: Implementation methods: XML representations of EXPRESS schema and data. STEP-XML specifies the use of the Extensible Markup Language (XML) to represent EXPRESS schema (ISO 10303-11) and the data that is governed by those EXPRESS schema. It is an alternative method to STEP-File for the exchange of data according to ISO 10303.

The following specifications are within the scope of ISO 10303-28:

- Late Bound XML markup declaration set, independent of all EXPRESS schemas, to describe the XML representation of the data governed by each schema
- Early Bound XML markup declaration sets, for each of the schemas, to describe the XML representation of the data governed by that specific schema
- The mapping between the schema-specific and schema-independent XML markup declarations
- The form of XML documents containing EXPRESS schemas and/or data governed by EXPRESS schemas
- The XML markup declarations that enables XML representation of EXPRESS schemas
- The representation of EXPRESS primitive data type values as element content and as XML attribute values.

The following specifications are outside the scope of ISO 10303-28:

- XML markup declarations that depend on the semantic intent of the corresponding EXPRESS schema
- The mapping from an XML markup declaration to an EXPRESS schema. Note: Given an XML markup declaration set and its corresponding data set(s), it is possible to create an EXPRESS schema that captures the semantic intent of the data. However, this would requires an understanding of the meaning and use of the data that may not be captured by the XML markup declarations.
- The mapping from an XML representation of an EXPRESS schema back to the initial EXPRESS schema
- The mapping from the XML markup declarations that have been derived from an EXPRESS schema back to the initial EXPRESS schema
- The mapping of the final use of an XML schema.
