= Voluntary disclosure agreement =

In the United States, a voluntary disclosure agreement (VDA), is a program whereby taxpayers can receive certain benefits from proactively disclosing prior period tax liabilities in accordance with a binding agreement. Most states offer Voluntary Disclosure Agreements to encourage companies to comply with a state's tax laws and in turn generate revenue for the state that it may not have had if the company did not come forward and disclose its liabilities. Additionally, the state can generate future revenue by having a company register in their state to collect and remit certain taxes.

== Benefits ==
The primary benefits of a voluntary disclosure typically include:

- Limitations of the prior look-Back period - Usually the look-back period is limited to between 3 and 5 years as opposed to having no statute of limitations if no return has ever been filed. However, for the offshore voluntary disclosure program, there is an 8-year look back period. In some cases prospective agreements can be reached in which the taxpayer is forgiven of all past liabilities, but agrees to future compliance.
- Abatement of penalties - Most states will waive penalties on any prior period taxes that are remitted in connection with a voluntary disclosure agreement.
- Full or partial interest- A limited number of states will abate interest in full. Many states apply a reduced interest rate to prior period taxes remitted in connection with a voluntary disclosure agreement.
- Friendlier sales and use tax audit - While state taxing authorities typically reserve the right to audit taxpayers who come forward pursuant to a voluntary disclosure agreement, the audit will typically be limited to the reduced look-back period, and it would generally focus more on understanding and confirming the reasonableness of the taxpayer's liability quantification approach, rather than on uncovering additional liabilities.
- Brings closure to prior periods - The taxpayer will be comfortable knowing that prior period liabilities are closed and will be able to concentrate its compliance efforts on current and future periods.
- Protects potential buyers from prior ownership's liabilities.

== Disadvantages ==
- Cost - The main disadvantage of this alternative is the cost. This alternative usually requires the assistance of a third party service provider who will require a fee for their services and the compliance cost might outweigh the benefits (i.e. if the potential exposure is not material).
- Compliance burden - The taxpayer will have an increased compliance burden immediately and going forward, as they will now be required to remit and report taxes.
