= VDA-FS =

VDA-FS is a CAD data exchange format for the transfer of surface models from one CAD system to another. Its name is an abbreviation of "Verband der Automobilindustrie - Flächenschnittstelle", which translates to the "automotive industry association - surface data interface". Standard was specified by the German organization VDA

VDA-FS has been superseded by STEP, ISO 10303.

== See also ==
- VDA 6.1
