= ENX Association =

European association

- Formation: June 14, 2000; 26 years ago
- Type: Association in line with French law of 1901 (non-Profit)
- Location(s): Boulogne-Billancourt and Frankfurt am Main
- Members: 12
- President: Philippe Ludet
- Website: www.enx.com/en-us/

The ENX Association is an organization comprising European vehicle manufacturers, suppliers, and related organizations.

== History ==
=== The Association ===
Founded in 2000, the ENX Association is an organization under French law of 1901. Its headquarters are located in Boulogne-Billancourt, France, and Frankfurt am Main. The twelve members of the association, all represented on the ENX board, are Audi, Aumovio, BMW, Bosch, Magna, Mercedes-Benz, Ford, Renault, Valeo, Volkswagen, and the automotive associations GALIA (France) and SMMT (UK). The association can accept additional members upon request; however, its rules specify that the total number of members is limited.

=== Fields of activity ===
The ENX Association is a non-profit organization that serves as the legal and organizational framework for the ENX network standard. It provides participating companies with a platform for exchanging information and initiating pre-competitive project cooperation in information technology. The main impetus behind the German and French industries creating the standard was to protect intellectual property while reducing costs and complexity related to data exchange within the automotive industry.

One cited benefit of creating a "Trusted Community" for various industry branches is that, while companies protect their infrastructures, problems arise when encryption or authentication solutions are used across different companies but need to be acknowledged as confidential. An impasse often occurs when both sides try to implement their own mechanisms. This is exemplified by email encryption, where conflicting safety regulations and numerous unencrypted data connections create issues due to shared application use. A shared, confidential infrastructure offers a solution. Ford, for example, cites the use of ENX to communicate with suppliers as an example of how significant savings can be achieved through consolidation and standardization.

Implementing industrial requirements for IT security between companies represents an additional area of activity. The following subject areas are addressed:

- Secure cloud computing (between companies)
- Protecting intellectual property during development cooperation (e.g., using Enterprise Rights Management, ERM)

The assessment of meeting these requirements is standardized and carried out by approved external service providers. The ENX Association approves these providers and develops and governs the TISAX standard for this purpose. The Trusted Information Security Assessment Exchange (TISAX) enables producers to rely on the information security practices implemented by their service providers and suppliers in their ISM systems. TISAX serves a similar function to the ISO/IEC 27001 standard but is tailored to the needs of the automotive industry, does not issue public certificates, and distinguishes between different levels of implementation.

The ENX Association is a member of the ERM Open Project by ProSTEP iViP e.V. and was active in the precursor project SP2, working alongside Adobe, BMW, FH Augsburg, Continental, Daimler, Fraunhofer IGD, Microsoft, PROSTEP, Siemens PLM, TU Darmstadt, TAC, Volkswagen, and ZF Friedrichshafen.

The SkIdentity project, in which the ENX Association is involved, was named one of the 12 winners of the BMWi technology competition "Secure Cloud Computing for Medium-Sized Businesses and the Public Sector - Trusted Cloud" by the Federal Ministry of Economics and Technology (BMWi) on 1 March 2011 at the IT exhibition CeBIT in Hanover. The BMWi established the Trusted Cloud program to promote "the development and testing of innovative, secure, and legally compliant cloud solutions."

== Use of the ENX network ==
=== Usage scenarios ===
The automotive industry is characterized by strong international cooperation and a need for companies to closely coordinate linked processes, which requires precise alignment and seamless data exchange between partners. This makes "integrated global network concepts" necessary. ENX is a platform that provides the foundation for these cooperative production models.

Realignment began at the end of 2002 with the aim of aligning technical development consistently with user requirements, particularly for small and medium-sized businesses. The implementation took several years. In June 2004, French users complained about the lack of cost-effective entry-level solutions in the France Telecom portfolio.

According to the trade press, some vehicle manufacturers have been advocating for the use of OFTP2 over the Internet since 2010, affecting "tens of thousands of suppliers." In this widely accessible medium, substantially more security is required for the transfer of sensitive data, and estimating the implementation costs can be challenging.

=== Registration as a pre-requisite for use ===
To use the ENX network, you must register with the ENX Association. Registration can be completed either directly with the ENX Association or through one of its representatives.

=== Representatives of the ENX Association ===
In some countries and industries, ENX is represented by industrial associations and organizations (known as ENX Business Centres). These organizations act as contact points in the relevant local language, process registration applications, and handle the initial authorization of new users within their area of representation.

The ENX Association has adopted this model of representation to enable industrial associations and similar organizations to manage user groups independently.

Organisation	Headquarters	Country of domicile	Area of representation
GALIA	Boulogne-Billancourt	France France	French automotive industry
DGA	Paris	France France	Defence and aerospace industry
ACAROM	Bukarest	Romania Romania	Romanian automotive industry
Odette Schweden	Stockholm	Sweden Sweden	Swedish automotive industry
ANFAC	Madrid	Spain Spain	Spanish automotive industry
SMMT	London	United Kingdom United Kingdom	British automotive industry

== Operating the ENX network ==
=== Operating the network and the data links ===
==== Operation by certified service providers ====
The ENX network meets the quality and security requirements typical of company-owned networks while remaining as open and flexible for participating vehicle manufacturers, suppliers, and their development partners as the public Internet. Data exchange between ENX users occurs via the network of a communication service provider certified by the ENX Association, using an encrypted Virtual Private Network (VPN).

The first certified communication service provider was Deutsche Telekom's subsidiary T-Systems. This was followed by Orange, Telefónica, Infonet, and, in 2007, Verizon Business. In 2010, three additional companies—ANXeBusiness, BCC, and Türk Telekom—successfully acquired ENX certification. According to information from the ENX Association, Open Systems AG is another service provider currently undergoing the certification process.

The services provided by the certified service providers are interoperable and offered in a competitive environment.

==== Overview of the service providers certified in line with the ENX standard ====
Certification	Company	Country of domicile	Geographical focus	Comment
2010	ANXeBusiness	United States	Nordamerika	
2010	BCC GmbH	Germany	Approx. 150 countries worldwide	ENX services also via public Internet
2005	Infonet Corp. / BT Infonet	United States	Approx. 100 countries worldwide	ENX operation since 2011 through KPN International
2010	KPN International	Netherlands	Approx. 100 countries worldwide	Formerly Infonet Nederland
2011	Open Systems	Switzerland	Approx. 200 countries worldwide	ENX services via public Internet
2002	Orange Business	France	France	
2001	T-Systems GmbH	Germany	Germany, individual countries worldwide	
2010	Türk Telekom	Turkey	Turkey	
2007	Verizon Deutschland GmbH	Germany	Approx. 150 countries worldwide	ENX services also via public Internet

==== Certification process ====
According to the ENX Association, certification is a two-stage process. The first stage, known as the concept phase, involves testing to determine whether the service provider's ENX operating model meets the technical ENX specifications. The second stage involves putting the operating model into practice. This includes inspecting the internal organization, testing IPSec interoperability in the "ENX IPSecLab," implementing ENX encryption, and connecting to providers already certified via private peering points, known as "ENX Points of Interconnection." Once these steps are completed, the implementation and adherence to ENX specifications are tested in a pilot run. With appropriate preparation by the service provider, the chargeable certification can typically be completed within approximately three to four months.

=== Central operational elements behind the scenes ===
Central services are provided on behalf of and under the control of the ENX Association. These services facilitate simplified connectivity ("interconnectivity") between individually certified service providers and ensure the interoperability of the encrypted hardware used. They include the Points of Interconnection ("ENX POIs"), the IPSec Interoperability Laboratory ("ENX IPSec Lab"), and the Public Key Infrastructure ("ENX PKI") at the ENX Trust Centre.

The Points of Interconnection have a geographically redundant structure, are interconnected, and are operated in data processing centers located in the following regions: Rhine-Main region, Germany; Île-de-France, France; and the East Coast of the United States.

These central operational elements are not visible to individual users. The customer sources their own connection, including IP router, encryption hardware, key material, uninterrupted end-to-end encryption for each communication, and individual service level agreements, directly from the certified telecommunications service provider they have chosen.

== Global availability ==
=== JNX industry network and the ANXeBusiness in North America ===
The Japanese automotive industry has an industry network similar to ENX in terms of technology and organization, called the Japanese Network Exchange (JNX). The network is managed by the JNX Centre, which is associated with the Japanese automotive associations JAMA and JAPIA. JNX and ENX are not linked.

In contrast, there are significant technical, organizational, and commercial differences between the ENX standard and the American ANX, which was developed in the 1990s.

=== Connection between Europe and North America ===
==== ENX as a mutual standard since 2010 ====
On 26 April 2010, the ENX Association and ANX eBusiness announced their plan to connect their networks to establish a global standard in the automotive industry. This connection resulted in a transatlantic industry network with over 1,500 connected companies. The network went live with the completion of the pilot stage on 26 May 2010.

According to statements from both the ENX Association and ANX eBusiness Corp., only the ENX standard is used for transatlantic connections in both Europe and North America. The ANX and ENX have stated that the interconnection is free of charge for individual users.

==== Differences between ENX and ANX ====
The network for North America, known as the Automotive Network Exchange (ANX), is operated by ANXeBusiness Corp. Although, like ENX, it was originally initiated by the automotive industry and operated by a consortium, it differs from ENX in that it was sold and is now operated as a classic profit-making service company.

ANX is a physical network with a strong focus on availability. It relies on the continuous operation of fixed connections with high uptime guarantees. Additionally, ANX offers an optional VPN tunnel management product called "TunnelZ," though not all manufacturers and suppliers connected to the network use it. In the classic ANX network, key management is handled using Pre-Shared Key (PSK), and the encryption strength is limited to DES.

ENX is set up as a managed security service, incorporating standardized tunnel management, a trust center-based Public Key Infrastructure (PKI), and authentication and encryption mechanisms across various networks (from private to public).

While the ANX network has a single provider, ANXeBusiness, for its customers, ENX services are provided by various competing companies.

To bridge the networks, ANXeBusiness continues to operate its network separately from ENX. However, it provides every ANX user who desires the service with an active native ENX connection, including all necessary security and service features, via its physical network. ANX has undergone certification and monitoring by the ENX Association and acts as an ENX-certified service provider.

==== Summary ====
With ANXeBusiness's certification as an ENX provider, ENX and ANX leverage their organizational differences—ENX being a non-profit industrial consortium and ANX being a service provider—to connect the two networks. This connection does not imply mutual interoperability but rather that ANX has adopted the ENX standard. This development is expected to offer new market opportunities for ANX, potentially giving it access to all ENX users. Concurrently, it is anticipated that this bridge to ANX will facilitate entry for other ENX service providers in the USA, thereby fostering competition.
