= Product and manufacturing information =

Product and manufacturing information, also abbreviated PMI, conveys non-geometric attributes in 3D computer-aided design (CAD) and collaborative product development systems necessary for manufacturing product components and assemblies. PMI may include geometric dimensions and tolerances, 3D annotation (text) and dimensions, surface finish, and material specifications. PMI is used in conjunction with the 3D model within model-based definition to allow for the elimination of 2D drawings for data set utilization.

== Uses and visualization ==
The PMI annotation is created on the 3D CAD model, associated to edges and faces, and can be exported into neutral formats such as ISO 10303 STEP and 3D PDF. This information can then be used by a number of down-stream processes. PMI can be used to generate annotation on a traditional 2D drawing the data. However, generally, PMI is used to visualized product definition within the 3D model, thus removing the need for drawings. Some 3D model formats enable computer-aided manufacturing software to access PMI directly for CNC programming. The PMI also may be used by tolerance analysis and coordinate-measuring machine (CMM) software applications if the modeling application permits.

PMI items are often organized within annotation views. Annotation views typically view including camera/view position, selected and also the particular state of the assembly (visibility, rendering mode, sometime even position of each element of the assembly). CAD applications have different notions of PMI Views (for instance "Capture Views" and "Annotation Views" are specific to Dassault Systèmes CATIA, etc.).

For anyone to be able to display any kind of PMI View, Adobe Systems has unified their format and added their description to the PDF format (version 1.7).

== Communication deliverables ==
In an effort to unify the visualization of PMI across the different existing solutions, Adobe Systems has released a version of the Myriad CAD font that allows display of PMI information from almost any CAD application. Similarly, Siemens Digital Industries Software offers downloadable font sets for multiple languages such as for Asian character sets.

The ISO 10303 STEP standards also handle a wide range of PMI information. ISO 10303 is an ISO standard for the computer-interpretable representation and exchange of product manufacturing information. It is an ASCII-based format.[1]: 59 Its official title is: Automation systems and integration — Product data representation and exchange. It is known informally as "STEP", which stands for "Standard for the Exchange of Product model data". ISO 10303 can represent 3D objects in Computer-aided design (CAD) and related information

== Standards ==
Industry standards for defining PMI include ASME Y14.41-XXXX Digital Product Data Definition Practices and ISO 1101:2004 Geometrical Product Specifications (GPS) -- Geometrical tolerancing—Tolerances of form, orientation, location and run-out.
