= Verband der Automobilindustrie =

German interest group

Verband der Automobilindustrie e.V. German Association of the Automotive Industry
- Founded: January 19, 1901
- Type: registered society
- Purpose: Political advocacy for automotive companies in Germany
- Location: Berlin
- Origins: Verein Deutscher Motorfahrzeug-Industrieller (VDMI)
- Region served: national
- Method: Political lobbying
- Members: more than 600
- Key people: Hildegard Müller (President)
- Website: www.vda.de

The German Association of the Automotive Industry or VDA (German: Verband der Automobilindustrie e. V.) is a German interest group of the German automobile industry, both automobile manufactures and automobile component suppliers. It is member of the European Automobile Manufacturers Association (ACEA).

The VDA represents carmakers, including BMW, Volkswagen and Mercedes-Benz, but also counts foreign suppliers and foreign-owned carmakers like Opel and Ford among its members. The group is located in Berlin, Germany.

== Activities ==
The VDA hosts the Europe's largest motor show, the biannual International Motor Show Germany (IAA) in Frankfurt.

The VDA published a series of standards and recommendations. Among those is the German quality management system (QMS) for the automobile industry. The fourth edition was issued in December 1998, and became mandatory for all German car makers on April 1, 1999.

The VDA is a founding member of both the ENX Association (since 2000) and Odette International (since 2001).

== Leadership ==
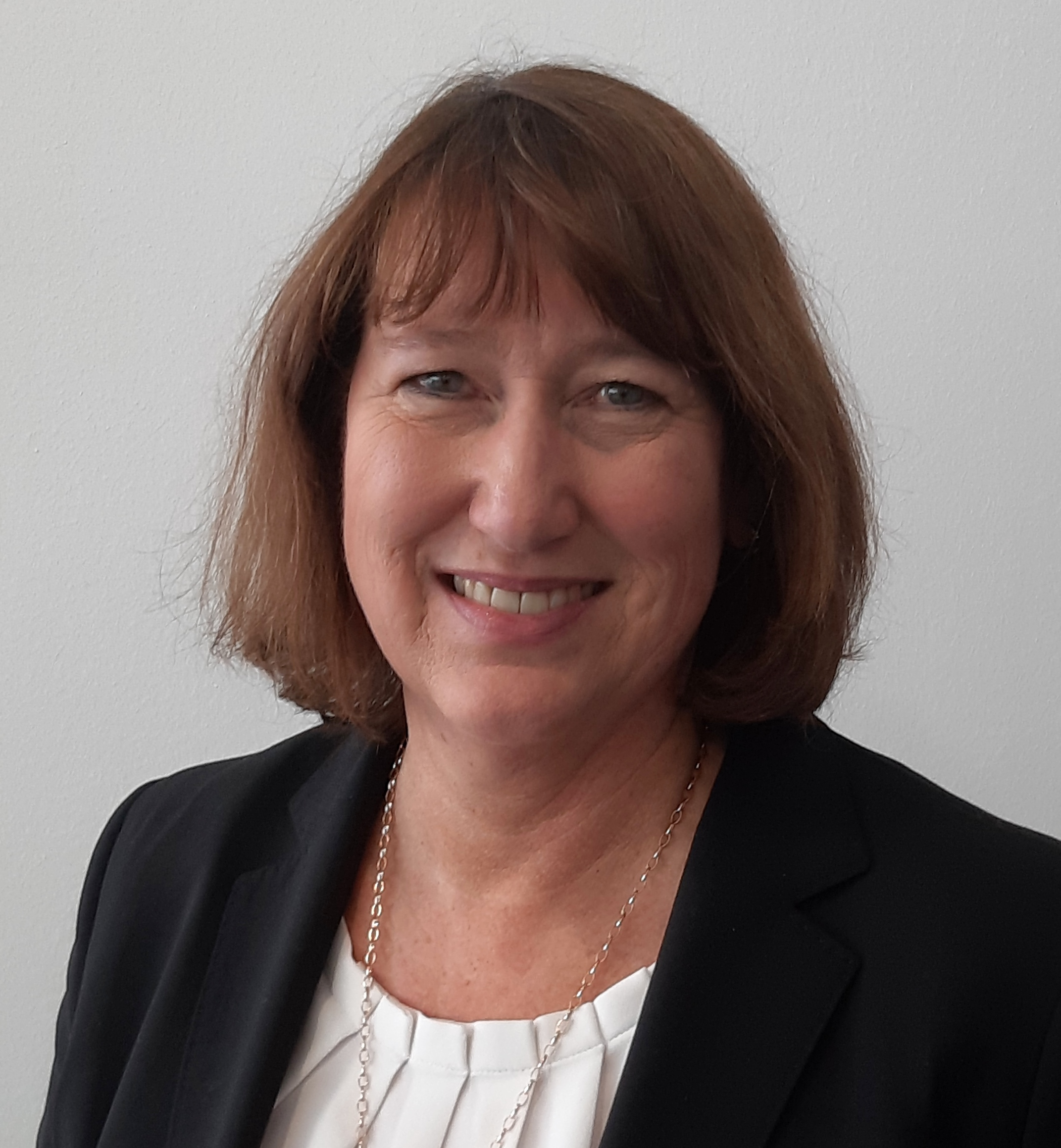
Hildegard Müller

- 1989–1996: Erika Emmerich
- 1996–2007: Bernd Gottschalk
- 2007–2018: Matthias Wissmann
- 2018–2020: Bernhard Mattes
- 2020–present: Hildegard Müller

== See also ==
- VDA 6.1
