= Comparison of 3D computer graphics software =

3D computer graphics software refers to packages used to create 3D computer-generated imagery.

== General information ==
=== Current software ===
This table compares elements of notable software that is currently available, based on the raw software, with no added plug-ins.

Application	Latest release date and version	Developer	Platforms	Main uses	License
3ds Max	2026-05-21 v 2027.1	Autodesk	Windows	Modeling, animation (video games and films only), FX simulation, lighting, rendering	Proprietary
AC3D	2022-04-27 v 9.0	Inivis	Linux, macOS, Windows	Modeling	Proprietary
Alibre Design	2022-08-03 v 25	Alibre, LLC	Windows	Computer aided design	Proprietary
AutoCAD	2022-03-28 v 2023	Autodesk	macOS, Windows	2D computer aided design, 3D modeling, basic rendering, rudimentary animation (of camera, not objects)	Proprietary
Blender	2026-07-14 v 5.2	Blender Foundation	Windows, macOS, Linux, BSD, Solaris, AmigaOS 4, MorphOS	2D–3D cartoon animation, lighting, modeling, node based material creation, texturing, 3D texture painting, UV mapping, rendering (internal, external, 3D anaglyph and VR), 3D rigging and animation, sculpting, visual 3D effects, basic post-production video editing, motion tracking, Python scripting, fluid simulation, particles, physics, compositing	GPL-2.0-or-later
Carrara	2013-08-26; 8.5.1.19	Daz 3D	Windows, macOS	Animation, modeling	Proprietary
Cheetah 3D	2024-01-26 v 8.0	Martin Wengenmayer	macOS	Animation, modeling, rendering	Proprietary
Cinema 4D	2025-2-12; 2025.1.3	Maxon	macOS, Windows, Amiga OS	Animation, lighting, modeling, visual 3D effects, rendering, simulation	Proprietary
CityEngine	2018-09-18 v 2018.1	Esri	macOS, Windows, Linux	Procedural Modeling of 3D Cities	Proprietary
Cobalt	2020-02-04 v11	Ashlar-Vellum	macOS, Windows	Modeling, computer aided design, animation	Proprietary
DesignSpark Mechanical	2020-07-20 v5.0	SpaceClaim, RS Components	Windows	Modeling, computer aided design, rapid prototyping, 3D printing	Proprietary
Electric Image Animation System	2013-06 v9.1.0	EIAS3D	macOS, Windows	Animation, lighting, rendering, film, television, visual 3D effects	Proprietary
FreeCAD	2024-01-08 v 0.21.2	Jürgen Riegel, Werner Mayer, Yorik van Havre	macOS, Windows, unix, Linux	CAD, FEA with Calculix, Python scripting, parametric design, robot simulation, CAM, BIM, import and export	LGPL 2.0 or later
form-Z pro/jr/free	2020-02-? 9.0.2	Autodessys, Inc.	macOS, Windows	Animation, modeling, lighting, rendering, fabricating, set design	Proprietary
Hexagon	2018-02-16; 2.5.2.109	Daz 3D	Windows, macOS	Subdivision modeling, UV mapping	Proprietary
HiCAD	2017-02-13 v HiCAD 2017	ISD Software und Systeme	Windows	2D/3D modeling, computer aided design, Automatic drawing generation, BIM, animation, HELiOS PDM integration, API scripting	Proprietary
Houdini	2026-07-15 v 22.0.368	Side Effects Software	Windows, macOS, Linux	Animation, lighting, modeling, visual 3D effects	Proprietary
iClone	2026-02-12 v 8.7.5009.1	Reallusion	Windows	Animation, film and television previz, videogame asset creation, lighting, visual 3D effects	Proprietary
Inventor	2021-01 v 2021.2.1	Autodesk	Windows	Modeling, computer aided design, rapid prototyping, 3D printing	Proprietary
LightWave 3D	2025-06-11 v 2025.0.2	LightWave Digital	macOS, Windows, Amiga OS	Modeling, animation, lighting, rendering, film and television previz, videogame asset creation	Proprietary
MASSIVE	? v 3.5	Massive Software	Windows, Linux	Artificial intelligence in models	Proprietary
Maya	2026-03-25 v 2027	Autodesk	Windows, macOS, Linux	Modeling, NURBS modeling sculpting, rigging, skinning, retargeting, animation, lighting, rendering, Bifrost fluids, Python scripting, Bifrost ocean simulation system, UV mapping, MASH procedural effects, time and graph editor, Arnold renderer, color management polygon modeling, visual 3D effects	Proprietary
Metasequoia	2026-06-02; 4.9.1	tetraface Inc.	Windows, macOS	Modeling	Proprietary
OpenSCAD	2021-01-31 v 2021.01	Marius Kintel, Claire Wolf	macOS, Windows, Unix, Linux	CAD, scripting, parametric design, CSG	GPL-2.0-or-later
PTC Creo (former Pro/Engineer)	2020 v 7.0	PTC	Windows, HP-UX, Unix	Modeling, computer aided design	Proprietary
Remo 3D	2025-09-10 v 3.2.1	Remograph	Windows, Linux	Modeling, virtual reality, real-time modeling, video game creation, computer aided design	Proprietary
Rhinoceros 3D	2026-07-07 v 8.33	McNeel	Windows, macOS	Modeling, computer aided design, scripting with Grasshopper, many plug-in for simulation, CAM, BIM, rendering, and more	Proprietary
Salome	2020-12-01 v 9.6	Open Cascade EDF CEA	Windows, Unix, Linux	CAD, scripting, parametric design, CSG, meshing, pre-post for CAE	LGPL 2.1 or later
Shade 3D	2026-07-31 v 27	FORUM 8	macOS, Windows	Modeling, computer aided design, rendering, animation	Proprietary
Silo	2026-06-02 v 2026.1	Nevercenter	macOS, Windows	Modeling	Proprietary
Tekla Structures	2024-09-13 v 2024 SR 4.1	Tekla	Windows	3D modeling, reporting, 2D drawings, 3D drawings, CAD, CAM, BIM	Proprietary
SketchUp Desktop	2026.0	Trimble Navigation	macOS, Windows	Modeling, computer aided design	Proprietary
Solid Edge	2020-06-? 2021 ST13	Siemens Digital Industries Software	Windows	Computer aided design	Proprietary
SolidWorks	2022-07-11 v SolidWorks 2022 SP3.1	Dassault Systèmes	Windows	Computer aided design	Proprietary
SpaceClaim	2020-08-08 v 2020.R2	Ansys	Windows	Computer aided design	Proprietary
Verto Studio 3D	2021-02-12 v2.5.0	Michael L. Farrell	macOS, iOS	Mobile modeling, texture mapping, lighting	Proprietary
Wings 3D	2024-11-10 v 2.4	Dan Gudmundsson (maintainer)	macOS, Windows, BSD, Linux	Modeling, sculpting (the deformation of the model), UV mapping	BSD
ZBrush	2026-06-17 v 2026.2.1	Maxon	macOS, Windows	Modeling, texturing, lighting, sculpting (the deformation of the model), rendering	Proprietary

=== Inactive software ===
There are many discontinued software applications.

Application	Latest release date and version	Developer	Platforms	Main uses	License
Bryce	2010-12-23; 7.1.0.109	Daz 3D	Windows (32-bit), macOS (10.7 and above)	Animation, landscape modeling, fractal geometry	Proprietary
Clara.io	redesigned in 2015-03-31	Exocortex	Mozilla Firefox, Google Chrome, Microsoft Internet Explorer	Modeling, animation, rendering	Proprietary
E-on Vue	2021-12-09 v 2021.2	E-on Software (part of Bentley Systems)	macOS, Windows	Animation, landscape modeling, lighting	Proprietary
Modo	2022-06-21; 16v2	The Foundry	macOS, Windows, Linux	Modeling, animation, rendering	Proprietary
POV-Ray	2013-11-09 v3.7.0	The POV-Team	macOS, Windows, Linux, AmigaOS	Lighting, visual 3D effects	AGPL-3.0-or-later
SketchUp Make	2017-11-14 v 18.0.16975 (Win64) v 18.0.16976 (Mac64)	Trimble Navigation	macOS, Windows	Modeling, computer aided design	Proprietary
Softimage	2014-04-14 "2015" (final release)	Autodesk	Windows, Linux	Modeling, animation, video game creation, lighting, rendering, visual 3D effects	Proprietary
solidThinking Evolve (predecessor of Altair Inspire Studio)	?-? v 9.0	Altair Engineering	macOS, Windows	Modeling	Proprietary
trueSpace	2009-05-25 v 7.61	Caligari Corporation	Windows, AmigaOS	Animation, modeling	Proprietary
VistaPro	2005 v 4.2	Hypercube Engineering, Monkey Byte Development	Windows	Landscape modeling	Proprietary
Mudbox	2022-04-18; 2023	Autodesk	macOS, Windows, Linux	Lighting, sculpting (the deformation of the model)	Proprietary

== Operating system support ==
The operating systems on which the editors can run natively (without emulation or compatibility layers), meaning which operating systems have which editors specifically coded for them (not, for example, Wings 3D for Windows running on Linux with Wine).

Application	Windows	macOS	Linux	Unix	BSD	iOS	Android	Other
3ds Max	Yes	No	No	No	No	No	No	
AC3D	Yes	Yes	Yes	No	No	No	No	
Art of Illusion	—N/a	—N/a	—N/a	—N/a	—N/a	—N/a	—N/a	Java virtual machine
AutoCAD	Yes	Yes	No	No	No	Partial		
Blender	Yes	Yes	Yes	Yes	Yes	ios branch	unofficial	(Note: Old versions supported AmigaOS, Solaris, and MorphOS)
Carrara	Yes	Yes	No	No	No	No	No	
Cheetah 3D	No	Yes	No	No	No	No	No	
Cinema 4D	Yes	Yes	Commandline Renderer only	No	No	Cinema 4D for iPad beta	No	Amiga OS
Clara.io	Yes	Yes	Yes	Yes	Yes	?	Yes	ChromeOS
DesignSpark Mechanical	Yes	No	No	No	No	No	No	
Electric Image Animation System	Yes	Yes	No	No	No	No	No	
form-Z	Yes	Yes	No	No	No	No	No	
HiCAD	Yes	No	No	No	No	No	No	
Houdini	Yes	Yes	Yes	No	No	No	No	
IClone	Yes	No	No	No	No	No	No	
LightWave 3D	Yes	Yes	No	No	No	No	No	(Note: LightWave 3D 5.0 and before supported AmigaOS.)
MakeHuman	Yes	Yes	Yes	No	No	No	No	
Massive	Yes	No	Yes	No	No	No	No	
Maya	Yes	Yes	Yes	dropped (Note: Maya 1.0 - 6.5 supported SGI Irix.)	No	No	No	
Metasequoia	Yes	Yes	No	No	No	No	No	
Modo	Yes	Yes	Yes	No	No	No	No	
POV-Ray	Yes	Yes	Yes	No	No	No	No	(Note: Old versions supported Amiga OS, and Atari TOS)
Remo 3D	Yes	No	Yes	No	No	No	No	
Shade	Yes	Yes	No	No	No	Shade3D mobile	No	
Silo	Yes	Yes	dropped in 2.5	No	No	No	No	
SketchUp	Yes	Yes	SketchUp for Web	?	?	Yes	Viewer for Android	
Tekla Structures	Yes	No	No	No	No	No	No	
Softimage	Yes	No	XSI 2.0 and later	dropped	No	No	No	
Solid Edge	Yes	No	No	No	No	No	No	
solidWorks	Yes	No	No	No	No	No	No	
solidThinking	Yes	Yes	No	No	No	No	No	
SpaceClaim	Yes	No	No	No	No	No	No	
trueSpace	Yes	No	No	No	No	No	No	Amiga OS
Verto Studio 3D	No	Yes	No	No	No	Yes	No	
E-on Vue	Yes	Yes	No	No	No	No	No	
Wings 3D	Yes	Yes	Yes	No	No	No	No	
ZBrush	Yes	Yes	No	No	No	Yes	No	
Application	Windows	macOS	Linux	Unix	BSD	iOS	Android	Other

== Features ==
Application	Modeling	3D Painting	Animation	Rendering	3D Tracking	Compositing
3ds Max	Yes	Yes	Yes	Yes	No	Some
AC3D	Yes	?	?	No	No	No
Blender	Yes	Yes	Yes	Yes	Yes	Yes
Electric Image Animation System	dropped	?	Yes	Yes	No	?
Cinema 4D	Yes	Yes	Yes	Yes	R16 and later	No
Clara.io	Yes	?	Yes	Yes	No	?
Cobalt	Yes	?	Yes	Yes	No	?
HiCAD	Yes	Yes	Yes	Yes	No	No
Houdini	Yes	Yes	Yes	Yes	No	Yes
IClone	Yes	?	Yes	Yes	?	?
Lightwave 3D	Yes	No	Yes	Yes	2026 and later	Yes
MakeHuman	parameter-based	No	No	No	No	No
Maya	Yes	Yes	Yes	Yes	dropped (Maya Live)	dropped (Maya Composer, Maya Fusion, and Maya Composite)
Metasequoia	Yes	No	No	Yes	No	No
Modo	Yes	Yes	Yes	Yes	No	No
Remo 3D	Yes	No	Yes	Yes	No	No
Shade	Yes	No	Yes	Yes	No	No
Softimage	Yes	3.7 or later	Yes	Yes	No	Yes
Solid Edge	Yes	?	Yes	Yes	No	?
SketchUp Make	Yes	?	Yes	Yes	No	No
SketchUp Desktop	Yes	?	Yes	Yes	No	No
Wings3D	Yes	?	No	Yes	No	?
Application	Modeling	3D Painting	Animation	Rendering	3D Tracking	Compositing

== I/O ==
=== Image, video, and audio files ===
Application	Imports				Exports			
Application	EXR	DDS	KTX	others	EXR	DDS	KTX	others
3ds Max	Yes	Yes	?	BMP, Cineon, TGA, JPG, PNG, Cineon, Radiance HDR, SGI, RLA, RPF, AVI, MPEG and QuickTime, GIF, TIFF, PSD, MOV, YUV	?	?	?	?
Art of Illusion	No	No	No	GIF, JPG, PNG, BMP, HDR, SVG	?	?	?	JPG, PNG, BMP, TIFF, HDR, QuickTime
AC3D	?	Yes	?	GIF, JPG, PNG, BMP, PPM, Targa, TIFF	?	Yes	?	GIF, JPG, PNG, BMP, PPM, Targa, TIFF
Blender	Yes	Yes	?	TGA, JPG, PNG, DPX, Cineon, Radiance HDR, Iris, SGI Movie, IFF, AVIF, AVI and QuickTime, GIF, TIFF, PSD, MOV	Yes	?	?	TGA, JPG, PNG, DPX, Cineon, Radiance HDR, Iris, SGI Movie, IFF, AVIF, AVI and QuickTime, GIF, TIFF, PSD, MOV
Electric Image Animation System	?	?	?	TGA, JPG, PNG, BMP, Radiance HDR, AVI and QuickTime, TIFF, PSD, MOV	?	?	?	PNG, BMP, AVI and QuickTime GIF, TIFF, MOV
Cinema 4D	Yes	Yes	?	Radiance HDR, BodyPaint 3D, TIFF, PSD	Yes	Yes	?	Radiance HDR, BodyPaint 3D, TIFF, PSD
Clara.io	Yes	Yes	?	PNG, JPG	?	?	?	?
Cobalt	?	?	?	BMP, GIF, JPEG, PICT, PNG, PPM, XBM, XPM	?	?	?	BMP, GIF, JPEG, PICT, PNG, PPM, XBM, XPM
Houdini	Yes	Yes	?	?	Yes	No	?	?
IClone	?	?	?	JPG, BMP, GIF, TGA, PNG, AVI, WMV, MP3, WAV, popVideo	?	?	?	JPG, BMP, GIF, TGA, PNG, WMV, AVI, MP4, popVideo, FLV, iWidget
Lightwave 3D	Yes	?	?	TGA, JPG, PNG, AI, EPS, BMP, IFF, Radiance HDR, AVI and QuickTime, GIF, TIFF, PSD, MOV	Yes	?	?	TGA, JPG, PNG, BMP, Radiance HDR, IFF, AVI and QuickTime, GIF, TIFF, PSD, MOV
MakeHuman	?	?	?	?	?	?	?	?
Maya	Yes	Yes	?	Ai, Aiff, Pix, AVI, Cineon, EPS, GIF, Jpeg, Swf, Maya IFF, Maya16 IFF, MacPaint, PSD, PNG, Quantel, Quickdraw, MOV, RLA, SVG, SGI, SGI16, SGI Movie, TGA, TIF, BMP, HDR	Yes	Yes	?	Maya IFF, AVI, QT, GIF, Softimage, RLA, BMP, TIF, SGI RGB, Alias PIX, Jpeg, EPS, Cineon, Quantel, TGA, Macpaint, PSD, PNG, Quickdraw
Metasequoia	EX version only	Yes	No	BMP, JPG, PNG, IFF, TGA, PPM, TIFF, PSD, Radiance HDR	?	?	?	?
Modo	Yes	?	?	TGA, BMP, FLX, GIF, HDR, HDR, JP2, JPG, JPEG, PNG, SGI, EPS, AI, PSD	Yes	?	?	TGA, BMP, FLX, GIF, HDR, JP2, JPG, JPEG, PNG, TIF, MOV, MWV, PSD
Remo 3D	?	Yes	?	BMP, GIF, JPG, PNG, PNM, SGI (RGB), TGA, TIF	?	?	?	JPG, PNG, SGI (RGB), TIF, XPM
Shade	Yes	Yes	Yes	?	Yes	Yes	Yes	QuickTime VR, Piranesi EPix
Softimage	?	?	?	?	?	?	?	?
Solid Edge	?	?	?	?	?	?	?	?
SketchUp Desktop	?	?	?	JPG, PNG, TIF, TGA, BMP	?	?	?	JPG, PNG, TIF, BMP
SketchUp Desktop	?	?	?	JPG, PNG, TIF, TGA, BMP	?	?	?	JPG, PNG, TIF, BMP, MOV(on Mac), AVI (on Windows)
E-on Vue	?	?	?	?	?	?	?	?
Wings3D	?	?	?	?	?	?	?	?

=== General 3D files ===
Application	Imports			Exports			
Application	FBX	Other formats	Web, mobile, and VR (Note: VRML, Java 3D, Adobe Flash, Shockwave 3D, Acrobat 3D, OpenSceneGraph, USDZ, WebGL-related formats, etc...)	FBX	Other formats	glTF	Web, mobile, and VR
3ds Max	Yes	3DS, PRJ, AI, COLLADA, HTR, OBJ, SHP, SKP, TRC	VRML	Yes	3DS, AI, ASE, COLLADA, HTR, OBJ	Yes	M3G, VRML97
AC3D	Yes	3DS, AC3D, COLLADA, Lightwave, Massive, Milkshape Ascii, OBJ, OFF, Pointfield, Points, Terragen, Triangle, Vector	VRML 1.0, glTF	?	3DS, 3D Studio ASE, AC3D, Dive, DVS, DXF, COLLADA, Lightwave, Massive, Milkshape Ascii, OBJ, Triangle	?	VRML 1.0, VRML 2.0, X3D
Blender	Yes	COLLADA, 3DS, PLY, OBJ, SVG	X3D, glTF	Yes	COLLADA, PLY, OBJ, SVG, PC2	Yes	X3D
Electric Image Animation System	Yes	3DS, OBJ, LWO, MDD		?	3DS, OBJ, LWO	No	
Cinema 4D	Yes	OBJ, 3DS, QD3D, LWO/LWS	VRML 1, VRML 2	Yes	OBJ, 3DS, QD3D, W3D	Yes	VRML 1, VRML 2
Clara.io	Yes	OBJ, Collada, 3DS, LWO, GEO, PLY, SHP, XGL, ZGL, AC, BLEND, CSM, LWS	VRML, Three.js	Yes	OBJ, Collada	Yes	Three.js, Babylon.js
Cobalt	?	3DS, AI, ASCII Text	VRML	?	AI, ASCII Text, RAW Triangle	?	Shockwave 3D, VRML
Houdini	Yes	?		Yes	?	Yes	
IClone	Yes	OBJ, SKP (via 3DXChange)		Yes	OBJ (via 3DXChange)	?	
Lightwave 3D	Yes	3DS, COLLADA, OBJ, LWO, VideoScape	VRML, VRML97	Yes	3DS, COLLADA, OBJ, LWO	Yes	VRML, VRML97
MakeHuman	No	N/A		Yes	COLLADA, MHX, OBJ, STL	?	
Maya	Yes	Maya Ascii, Maya Binary, MEL, OBJ	VRML2	Yes	Maya Ascii, Maya Binary, Mel, OBJ, GE2, RTG	?	VRML2
Metasequoia	EX version only	3DS, COB, (Note: Caligari TrueSpace 3D Object format) LWO, OBJ, ROK (Rokkaku Daiō), SUF (DoGA CGA System)	glTF	EX version only	3DS, PMD, OBJ, COLLADA (Note: Metasequoia 4.0.0 dropped its RDS (Ray Dream Studio), and SCE (SoftF/X Model) exporters and 4.7.0 dropped its COB (Caligari TrueSpace 3D Object), DoGA CGA System SUF, and AMF exporters.)	Yes	(Note: Metasequoia 4.7.0 dropped the VRML 1.0 (WRL), and Three.js JMF exporters.)
Modo	Yes	LXO, LWO2, LWOB, 3DS, GEO, OBJ, COLLADA		Yes	LXO, LWO, PLT, GEO, OBJ, COLLADA	Yes	X3D
Remo 3D	Yes	3DC, 3DS, AC, Collada, OpenFlight, LWO, LWS, OBJ, P3D, PLY, STA, SHP	OSG (Note: OSG, OSGB, OSGT, OSGX, IVE and OSGA)	Yes	3DS, AC, Collada, DOT, OpenFlight, OBJ, P3D, STL	?	OSG
Shade	Yes	OBJ, SketchUp, XML; (Pro) 3DS, COLLADA, LWO		Yes	COLLADA, DXF, OBJ, XML; (Pro) 3DS, LWO	Yes	VRML 2.0, Flash (SWF)
Softimage	Yes	?		Yes	?	No	
Solid Edge	?			?		?	PDF
SketchUp Make	?	SKP, 3DS		?	COLLADA, SKP	?	
SketchUp Desktop	?	SKP, 3DS		Yes	COLLADA, SKP, EPS, EPX (removed v16+), 3DS, OBJ	?	PDF, VRML
E-on Vue	?	?	?	?	?	?	?
Wings3D	?	3DS, AI, EPS, LWO, LXO, Nendo, OBJ, SVG, Wings3D		dropped in 1.3.1	3DS, COLLADA, LWO, LXO, Nendo, OBJ, SVG, Wings3D	?	VRML 2.0

=== Game and renderer files ===
Application	Imports			Exports			
Application	OpenFlight (FLT)	other 3D game files	3D renderer files	OpenFlight (FLT)	OGRE	other 3D game files	3D renderer files
3ds Max	Yes			Yes	No		
AC3D	No	Quake III BSP, Quake II (MD2), Quake III Mesh (MD3), Irrlicht irrmesh, Renderware, SMF		No	Yes	DirectX X, Second Life Sculpted Prim, Quake II (MD2), Quake Map, SMF, Unreal Tournament	POV-Ray POV, RenderMan RIB
Blender	dropped			dropped	(blender2ogre addon)		POV-Ray POV
Electric Image Animation System	?			?	?		
Cinema 4D	?			?	?		
Clara.io	?	DirectX X, Irrlicht irrmesh	POV-Ray POV	?	?	Quake II (MD2), Quake III Mesh (MD3), Doom 3 (MD5)	
Cobalt	?			?	?		
Houdini	?			?	?		
IClone	?			?	?		
Lightwave 3D	?	Quake II (MD2)		?	?	Quake II (MD2)	
MakeHuman	No			?	Yes	Doom 3 (MD5)	
Maya	Yes			Yes	No		Mental Ray MI, RenderMan RIB
Metasequoia	No	(Note: Metasequoia 4.0.0 dropped its PlayStation RSD importer and exporter.)		No	No	DirectX X	RenderMan RIB (Note: Metasequoia 4.7.0 dropped its POV-Ray POV exporter.)
Modo	?			?	?		
Remo 3D	?	DirectX X, Quake II (MD2)		?			
Shade	?			?	?	DirectX X, Second Life Sculpted Prim, Blue Mars	RenderMan RIB
Softimage	?			?	?		
Solid Edge	?			?	?		
SketchUp Make	?			?	?		
SketchUp Desktop	?			?	?	dotXSI	
E-on Vue	?	?	?	?	?	?	?
Wings3D	?			?	?	BZFlag, DirectX X, Renderware	Kerkythea, POV-Ray POV

=== Cache and animation files ===
Application	Imports									Exports	
Application	Geometry Cache		Point Cache		Particle Cache				Animation	Exports	
Application	Alembic (*.abc)	Maya Cache (*.mc) (Note: Maya Cache and 3ds Max PC2 format are also used with FBX format.)	3ds Max PC2	LightWave MDD	Maya Particle Data (*.pda, *.pdb)	Houdini BGEO	RealFlow BIN	Krakatoa PRT	Biovision Hierarchy (*.bvh)	Alembic (*.abc)	others
3ds Max	Yes	Yes	Yes	?	?	?	?	?	?	Yes	
AC3D	?	?	?	?	?	?	?	?	?	?	
Blender	Yes	No	Mesh Cache Modifier		(BlenderPartioTools)				Yes	Yes	BVH
Electric Image Animation System	?	?	?	?	?	?	?	?	?	?	
Cinema 4D	Yes	?	?	?	?	?	?	?	?	Yes	
Clara.io	?	?	?	?	?	?	?	?	Yes	?	BVH
Cobalt	?	?	?	?	?	?	?	?	?	?	
Houdini	Yes	via FBX importer		?	?	Yes	?	?	?	Yes	
IClone	?	?	?	?	?	?	?	?	Yes	?	BVH
Lightwave 3D	Yes	?	?	Yes	Partio Node	No	?	?	?	Yes	
MakeHuman	?	?	?	?	?	?	?	?	?	?	
Maya	Yes	Yes	?	?	Yes	(MayaPartioTools)			?	Yes	
Metasequoia	?	?	?	?	?	?	?	?	?	?	
Modo	Yes	?	?	MDD Deformer	?	?	?	?	?	Yes	
Remo 3D	?	?	?	?	?	?	?	?	?	?	
Shade	?	?	?	?	?	?	?	?	?	?	BVH
Softimage	(Exocortex Crate)	?	?	Point Oven	?	?	?	?	?	(Exocortex Crate)	
Solid Edge	?	?	?	?	?	?	?	?	?	?	
SketchUp Make	?	?	?	?	?	?	?	?	?	?	
SketchUp Desktop	?	?	?	?	?	?	?	?	?	?	
E-on Vue	?	?	?	?	?	?	?	?	?	?	
Wings3D	?	?	?	?	?	?	?	?	?	?	

=== CAD files ===
Application	Imports				Exports			
Application	STL	DXF	DWG	others	STL	DXF	DWG	others
3ds Max	Yes	Yes	Yes	IGE, IGS, IGES, IPT, WIRE, IAM, LS, VW, LP, SAT, Catia V4/V5, JT, ProE, RVT, PRT, SolidWorks, (Note: SLDPRT and SLDASM) STEP, WIRE	Yes	Yes	Yes	ATR, BLK, DF, IGS, LAY, LP, SAT, VW
AC3D	Yes	Yes	No	LDraw (Lego), SOF Airfoil	Yes	Yes	No	Inventor, LDraw (Lego)
Blender	Yes	Yes (Note: via AutoCAD DXF addon)	No		Yes	Yes	No	
Electric Image Animation System	?	Yes	?		?	Yes	?	
Cinema 4D	Yes	Yes	Yes		Yes	Yes	?	
Clara.io	Yes	Yes	?		Yes	?	?	
Cobalt	?	Yes	Yes	ACIS SAT, CATIA v4, CCAD, CGM, CO (native), Drawing board, Facet, Grid Surface, IGS (IGES), Parasolid XT, Pro/E, Rhino 3DM, Spline, STP (STEP)	?	Yes	Yes	ACIS SAT, CATIA v4, CGM, CO (native), Drawing board, Facet, Grid Surface, IGS (IGES), Parasolid XT, PDF, Pro/E, STP (STEP)
Houdini	External		No		External		No	
IClone	?	?	?		?	?	?	
Lightwave 3D	Yes	Yes	No		Yes	Yes	No	
Maya	Windows and Mac only	Windows only		IGES, StudioTools Wire	Windows and Mac only	Windows only		IGES, StudioTools Wire, Open Inventor2
Metasequoia	Yes	Yes	No		Yes	Yes	No	
Modo	Yes	Yes	No	SolidWorks	Yes	Yes	No	
Remo 3D	Yes	Yes	No	DW (Designer Workshop)	Yes	No	No	
Shade	Yes	Yes	No		Yes	Yes	No	
Solid Edge	Yes	Yes	Yes	IGES, STEP, JT, ACIS (SAT), ProE, SolidWorks, NX, SDRC, Microstation, Inventor, CATIA (V4/V5), Parasolid, XML, MDS	Yes	Yes	Yes	IGES, STEP, EMS, JT, XGL, XML, Parasolid, CATIA (V4/V5), ACIS (SAT), Microstation
SketchUp Make	?	?	?		?	?	?	
SketchUp Desktop	Yes	Yes	Yes		Yes	Yes	Yes	
E-on Vue	?	?	?		?	?	?	
Wings3D	Yes	?	?		Yes	?	?	

=== Point clouds and photogrammetry files ===
Application	Imports				
Application	ASTM E57	LASer (LAS)	Leica Cyclone PTS/PTX/PTG	Autodesk ReCap RCS/RCP	VisualSFM NVM
3ds Max	?	?	?	Yes	?
Blender	E57 Point Cloud Importer addon	(Blender LiDAR Importer addon, Blender-Photogrammetry-Importer addon)	?	?	(Blender-Photogrammetry-Importer addon)
Houdini	Lidar Import geometry node		?	?	?

=== GIS and DEM files ===
Application	Imports							Exports
Application	USGS DEM	USGS SDTS (DDF)	LandXML	GeoTIFF	Shapefile	OSM	others	Exports
3ds Max	Yes	Yes	Yes	?	?	?		
AC3D	?	?	?	?	?	?		
Blender	?	?	?	(Blender GIS addon)				
Bryce	Yes	Yes	?	?	?	?	VistaPro DEM	USDS DEM
Electric Image Animation System	?	?	?	?	?	?		
Cinema 4D	Yes	?	?	?	?	?	VistaPro DEM	
Clara.io	?	?	?	?	?	?		
Cobalt	?	?	?	?	?	?		
Houdini	?	?	?	?	?	Yes (Note: via Game Development Toolset)		
IClone	?	?	?	?	?	?		
Lightwave 3D	(Ground Control plugin)	?	?	?	?	?		
MakeHuman	?	?	?	?	?	?		
Maya	?	?	?	?	?	?		
Metasequoia	?	?	?	?	?	?		
Modo	?	?	?	?	?	?		
Remo 3D	?	?	?	?	?	?		
Shade	?	?	?	?	?	?		
Solid Edge	?	?	?	?	?	?		
SketchUp Make	Yes	Yes	?	?	?	?	SKP+KMZ	SKP+KMZ
SketchUp Desktop	Yes	Yes	?	?	?	?	SKP+KMZ	SKP+KMZ
E-on Vue	Yes	Yes	?	Yes	?	?	DTED	
Wings3D	?	?	?	?	?	?		

== Supported primitives ==
Application	Polygon				Spline/Bézier Surface			Voxel, Volume	Metaball	Point Clouds	Particles
Application	Triangles	Quads	N-gons	with holes	NURBS regular patch	NURBS trimmed surface	Bicubic Bézier patch	Voxel, Volume	Metaball	Point Clouds	Particles
Blender	Yes	Yes	Yes	No	Yes	soc-2014-nurbs branch	No	2.83 and later	Yes	3.1 and later	Yes
Maya	Yes	Yes	Yes	Yes	Yes	Yes	No	3D Texture	Yes	No	Yes
3ds Max	Yes	Yes	Yes	?	Yes	Yes	Patch Objects	No	Yes	Yes	Yes
Cinema 4D	Yes	Yes	Yes	?	?	?	?	R20 and later	Yes	?	Yes
LightWave	Yes	Yes	Yes	Yes	(LWCAD plugin)		No	OpenVDB primitives	Yes	No	Yes
Rhinoceros	Yes	Yes	Yes	Yes	Yes	Yes	Yes	Grasshopper	Grasshopper	Grasshopper	Grasshopper
Shade 3D	Yes	Yes	Yes	?	CAD mode		Yes	No	Yes	No	Yes

Application	Curves										Bone	Text	Camera	Light	Speaker
Application	Linear	Quadratic Bézier	Cubic Bézier	B-spline	Cardinal spline	Hermite spline	TCB spline	Smoothstep	Akima spline	NURBS	Bone	Text	Camera	Light	Speaker
Blender	Bézier curve without subdivision	No	Yes	No	No	No	No	No	No	Yes	Yes	Yes	Yes	Yes	Yes
Maya	Yes	?	?	?	?	?	No	No	No	Yes	Yes	Yes	Yes	Yes	No
3ds Max	Yes	?	Yes	Yes	No	No	No	No	No	Yes	Yes	Yes	Yes	Yes	No
Cinema 4D	Yes	No	Yes	Yes	No	?	No	No	Yes	?	Yes	Yes	Yes	Yes	dropped in R23
LightWave	?	?	?	Yes	?	only in Graph Editor	only in Graph Editor	?	No	?	Yes	Yes	Yes	Yes	?
Shade 3D	?	?	Yes	?	No	No	No	No	No	Yes	Yes	Yes	Yes	Yes	Sound Object

== Modeling ==
Application	Hard surface Modeling		Sculpt Modeling						Non-destructive Modeling			
Application	Polygon Modeling	Subdivision Modeling	Base-mesh Creation	Sketch Modeling	Sculpting	Cloth Sculpting	Hand Retopology	Automatic Retopology	Boolean	Bevel	Modifier	Procedural
Maya	Yes	Yes	(SOuP BMesh)	No	Yes	No	Yes	2020 and later	Yes	Yes	?	Yes
3ds Max	Yes	Yes	(Form)	No	Paint Deform	No	Yes	2021.3 and later	Yes	Yes	Yes	Max Creation Graph
Blender	Yes	Yes	Skin Modifier	Trim Brush with Union/Join mode	Yes	2.83 and later	Yes	Yes	Yes	Yes	Yes	Geometry Nodes
ZBrush	ZModeler	ZModeler	ZSphere and ZSketch	MeshBalloon	Yes	2021 and later	Yes	ZRemesher	4R8 and later	?	No	No
Curvy 3D	No	No	No	Yes	Yes	No	?	?	?	?	No	No

== Lookdev, Shader writing ==
Application	PBR viewport	Viewport effects	Interactive GI Rendering	Integrated Compositing	Text editor for shader writing	Material Nodes	Turntable Rendering
Maya	Yes	Some	Arnold	No	?	Hypershade, Node Editor, ShaderFX	Yes
3ds Max	Yes	Some	Arnold	(State Set)	OSL Map	Slate Material Editor, ShaderFX	Easy Turntable script
MODO	Yes	?	Yes	No	?	Nodal Shading	Render Turntable
Blender	Eevee (2.80 and later)		Cycles	Yes	Text Editor	Yes	Turnaround Camera addon
Gaffer	No	No	Cycles	Yes	OSLCode Node	No	No
Marmoset Toolbag	Yes	Yes	No	No	?	Uber PBR shaders only	Yes
Substance Designer	Yes	YEBIS	NVIDIA Iray	?	?	MDL graph	?

== Layout ==
Application	Asset manager	Biome-based scattering system	Asset Paint	Placement with Physics
Maya	Yes	MASH World Node	MASH Placer Node	?
3ds Max	(Project Manager, Connecter)	?	?	?
Cinema 4D	Asset Browser	?	Scatter Pen	Dynamic Place
Houdini	Solaris	Project Dryad (beta)	Layout LOP's Brush mode	Edit LOP
Blender	Asset Browser	?	?	?

== Lighting ==
Application	Alembic Importer	USD Importer	Rendering Engine	Volume Rendering for clouds	Interactive Rendering	Isolating light contribution	Light Lister	IES Light	Physical Sun & Sky	Sun Positioning by location and times	Light Portal	Shadow Catcher	IBL and Environment texture			Highlight Placement	Light Mixer
Application	Alembic Importer	USD Importer	Rendering Engine	Volume Rendering for clouds	Interactive Rendering	Isolating light contribution	Light Lister	IES Light	Physical Sun & Sky	Sun Positioning by location and times	Light Portal	Shadow Catcher	Lat Long	sIBL	Light Extraction	Highlight Placement	Light Mixer
Maya	Yes	USD Extension for Maya	Maya Hardware 2.0	?	Yes	No	Light Editor	?	?	?	?	?	Yes	?	?	(Place Highlight Tool for Maya)	No
Maya	Yes	USD Extension for Maya	Maya Software	?	?	Light Linking	Light Editor	No	?	?	?	?	Env Sphere	?	?	(Place Highlight Tool for Maya)	No
Maya	Yes	USD Extension for Maya	Arnold	Yes	Yes	Light Linking	Light Editor	Ai Photometric Light	Yes	?	Yes	Yes	Yes	?	?	(Place Highlight Tool for Maya)	Light Mixer imager
3ds Max	Yes	(USD for Autodesk 3ds Max)	Quicksilver	?	Yes	No	Light Lister	?	?	?	?	?	?	?	?	Place Highlight	No
3ds Max	Yes	(USD for Autodesk 3ds Max)	Scanline	?	?	Light Exclude/include	Light Lister	?	?	?	?	Yes	?	sIBL-GUI software	?	Place Highlight	No
3ds Max	Yes	(USD for Autodesk 3ds Max)	ART	?	?	?	Light Lister	Yes	?	?	?	?	?	?	?	Place Highlight	No
3ds Max	Yes	(USD for Autodesk 3ds Max)	Arnold	Yes	Yes	Light Group	Light Lister	Ai Photometric Light	Yes	Sun Positioner	Yes	Yes	Yes	?	?	Place Highlight	Light Mixer imager
Blender	2.78 and later	3.0 and later	Workbench	Some	Yes	?	Property Chart Addon, Gaffer addon	No	?	Sun Position addon	No	?	Yes	?	?	Look At Gizmo (with Ctrl key)	No
Blender	2.78 and later	3.0 and later	EEVEE	Some	Yes	Light Linking	Property Chart Addon, Gaffer addon	No	Yes	Sun Position addon	No	Shader Node	Yes	?	?	Look At Gizmo (with Ctrl key)	No
Blender	2.78 and later	3.0 and later	Cycles	Yes	Yes	Light Groups, Light Linking	Property Chart Addon, Gaffer addon	2.80 and later	Yes	Sun Position addon	from 2.75	from 2.79	Yes	sIBL_GUI for Blender addon/ Add Environment nodes addon	?	Look At Gizmo (with Ctrl key)	No
MODO	Yes	14.1 and later	MODO Renderer, mPath	Yes	Yes	Light Linking	?	Photometric Light	Directional Light		Portal	Shadow Catcher	Yes	mm_sIBLToModoEnvironment script	?	?	No
LightWave	11.6 and later	No	LightWave Renderer	Yes	Yes	?	?	Photometric Light	Yes	Yes	Yes	Yes	Yes	original loader script, where most sIBL features were invented	?	?	No
Houdini	Yes	Solaris	Mantra (PT), Karma	Yes	Yes	Light categories	Light bank	Yes	?	?	?	Shadow matte	Yes	?	?	Solaris	?
Cinema 4D	Yes	R23 and later	CineRender	Yes	Yes	Exclude/include	?	Yes	?	?	?	from R18	Yes	?	?	Lighting tool	?
Cinema 4D	Yes	R23 and later	Redshift	Yes	Yes	Light Group AOVs	?	Yes	Yes	?	Yes	Matte options	Yes	?	?	Lighting tool	?

== Path-tracing rendering ==
Application	CPU rendering	GPU rendering						
Application	CPU rendering	OpenCL	NVIDIA CUDA, OptiX	AMD HIP	SYCL, Intel DPC++	Apple Metal	Texture streaming (out-of-core)	Mesh streaming
V-Ray	Yes	?	V-Ray GPU (Note: former V-Ray RT)		No	V-Ray GPU	Yes	?
RenderMan	Yes	No	24 and later	No	No	No	?	?
Arnold	Yes	No	Yes	No	No	No	Yes	?
Redshift	Yes	No	Yes	Yes	No	Yes	?	?
Modo mPath	Yes	No	Yes	No	No	No	?	?
Houdini Karma	Yes	No	Karma XPU	No	No	No	Yes	?
Octane Render	No	No	Yes	No	No	Octane X	Yes	meshlet streaming
Blender Cycles	Yes	dropped in 3.0	Yes	3.0 and later	3.3 and later	3.1 and later	2.80 and later	No

Application	Mipmap generation	Adaptive tessellation	Instancing	Camera culling	Deep pixel rendering	Fisheye stereo for fulldome	Omnidirectional stereo for HMD	Deforming motion blur
V-Ray	img2tiledexr	?	Yes	?	Yes	Domemaster Stereo Shader	3.2 and later	Yes
RenderMan	maketx (Note: `txmake` tool is also included for compatibility.)	?	Yes	?	Yes	?	Yes	Yes
Arnold	maketx	Yes	Yes	?	Yes	Domemaster Stereo Shader	5 and later	Yes
Houdini Karma	imaketx	?	Yes	?	Yes	?	15.5 and later	Yes
Blender Cycles	blender --command maketx	2.78 and later	Yes	Camera Cull	In development	2.78 and later	2.78 and later	Yes

== Optimizations ==
Application	Proxy generation		Opacity Micromap (Note: DirectX Raytracing 1.2 / Vulkan VK_EXT_opacity_micromap extension)	Texture baking			
Application	Level of detail (LoD) (Note: LodGroup in FBX, MSFT_lod extension in glTF, etc.)	Octahedral Impostors	Opacity Micromap	Tangent Space Normal Map	Ambient Occlusion (AO) Map	Light Map	
Application	Level of detail (LoD)	Octahedral Impostors	Opacity Micromap	Tangent Space Normal Map	Ambient Occlusion (AO) Map	Non-directional (Traditional)	Directional
Maya (Turtle renderer)	"Generate LOD Meshes"	?	?	Yes	Yes	Yes	RNM (Radiosity Normal Map), and SH (Spherical harmonics) coefficients
Enlighten	No	?	?	No	?	Yes	Yes
Houdini	Labs LOD Create SOP	Labs Impostor Texture ROP	?	?	?	?	?
Blender	AssetGen addon	No	No	Yes	Yes	Yes	No

== See also ==
- Comparison of raster graphics editors
- Comparison of vector graphics editors
- Comparison of computer-aided design software
- Comparison of CAD, CAM and CAE file viewers
- List of 3D modeling software
- List of 3D rendering software
