= List of 3D animation software =

The following is a list of 3D animation software that have articles in Wikipedia.

Title	License	Release date	Development
3D Movie Maker	MIT License	1995	March 18, 1995
Akeytsu	Commercial proprietary software	2017	
Aladdin4D	Commercial proprietary software		ongoing
Anim8or	Freeware	July 20, 1999	
Animation:Master	Commercial proprietary software	1992	
Autodesk 3ds Max	Trialware	April 1996	ongoing
Autodesk Maya	Trialware	February 1, 1998	ongoing
Autodesk MotionBuilder	Trialware	1994	
Autodesk Softimage	Discontinued (Trialware)	2000	2015
Blender	GPL v2 or later	January 2, 1994	ongoing
Bryce	Discontinued (Trialware)	1994	December 23, 2010
Carrara	Commercial proprietary software		
Cheetah3D	Trialware	December 1, 2003	
Cinema 4D	Proprietary	1990	
Clara.io	Discontinued	2013	
Daz Studio	Freemium	2005	ongoing
Electric Image Animation System	Demoware		
Houdini	Trialware	October 2, 1996	
iClone	Trialware	December 2005	
LightWave 3D	Trialware	1990	
Messiah	Proprietary	January 2000	
MikuMikuDance	Freeware	February 24, 2008	
Modo	Trialware	September 2004	
Moviestorm	Trialware	August 2008	
Muvizu	Trialware	April 2013	
Oculus Quill	Proprietary	November 29, 2018	
Presto	Proprietary		
Poser	Commercial proprietary software	1995	February 2021
Source Filmmaker	Freeware	June 27, 2012	
trueSpace	Discontinued	1994	
Twixt	Discontinued	1984	1987
ZBrush	Commercial proprietary software	1999	
Art of Illusion	GPL	October 29, 1999	ongoing
Seamless3d	MIT license	2001	
Poser (Software)	proprietary software	1995	
Unreal Engine	Freeware	May 1998	ongoing
Title	License	Release date	Development

== See also ==
- List of 2D animation software
- List of 3D computer graphics software
- List of 3D modeling software
- Comparison of 3D computer graphics software
