= Delta3D =

Game and simulation engine API

Delta3d
- Developer: Delta3d
- Stable release: 2.8.0 / September 29, 2014; 12 years ago
- Written in: C++
- Operating system: Cross-platform
- Type: Game engine
- License: LGPL-2.1-or-later
- Website: www.easd-design.com/delta3dengine/
- Repository: github.com/delta3d/delta3d

Delta3d is an open source software gaming/simulation engine API. Delta3d is managed and supported by Caper Holdings LLC. Previously the Modeling, Virtual Environments, and Simulation (MOVES) Institute at the Naval Postgraduate School in Monterey, California managed and supported delta3d. Alion Science has also been a major contributor to enhancements and features.

Delta3d is released under the GNU LGPL-2.1-or-later. The external modules have their own licensing. Some modules, such as Qt, require the user to download and install separately for use with Delta3d.

Delta3d is a widely used, community-supported, open-source game and simulation engine. delta3d is appropriate for a wide variety of uses including training, education, visualization, and entertainment. Delta3d is unique, because it offers features specifically suited to the Modeling, Simulation and DoD communities, such as the High Level Architecture (HLA), After Action Review (AAR), large scale terrain support, and SCORM Learning Management System (LMS) integration.

== The Delta3d engine ==
Delta3d is an open source engine which can be used for games, simulations, or other graphical applications. Its modular design integrates other well-known Open Source projects such as Open Scene Graph, Open Dynamics Engine, Character Animation Library (CAL3D), and OpenAL. Rather than bury the underlying modules, Delta3D integrates them together in an easy-to-use Application programming interface (API) -- always allowing access to the important underlying components. This provides a high-level API, while still allowing the end user the option of having low-level functionality. The Delta3D engine renders using the Open Graphics Library (OpenGL) that imports a whole list of diverse file formats (.flt, .3ds, .obj, even more so).

For a full list of features, please see the Delta3d Feature List page here.

=== Supported platforms ===
Delta3d is developed and tested on Windows XP using Microsoft Visual Studio, OS X using Clang, as well as Linux using GCC. All the underlying dependencies are cross-platform as well, so just about any platform should be compatible with a few minor modifications to the source.

=== Delta3d-Extras ===
Delta3d-Extras is a project housed on SourceForge which contains numerous projects related to the Delta3d Engine. Delta3d-Extras is not necessarily developed or maintained by the delta3d Development Team. However it is available for the community to share their delta3d-related projects with the world.

== Simulation Core ==
Simulation Core, commonly referred to as SimCore, is a "collaborative" implementation of delta3d functionality – providing the "base" capabilities for an MMORPG application using delta3d. SimCore is developed primarily by Alion Science and Technology. The first version of SimCore was developed as part of the Deployable Virtual Training Environment (DVTE) project for USMC which started in 2006. Although Alion is still the primary developer of SimCore, it is now used by a number of other companies and organizations across the Modeling and Simulation (M&S) community.

In order to build and "run" SimCore many additional libraries are required, including additions to the core Delta3d build.

Physics – special effects and particle system capabilities. A "Physics Abstraction Layer" (PAL), is used to provide a standard API to various physics libraries.

== Libraries ==
Several open-source products are part of the Delta3d package. One can build them or use the provided binaries/libraries to build and run Delta3d based applications on one's own computer system. The current version of a product may not be compatible with delta3d.

- Boost
- Bullet
- Cal3D
- CEGUI
- CppUnit
- expat (optional)
- FreeType
- Game Networking Engine (GNE)
- GDAL
- HawkNL
- libpng
- OpenAL Utility Toolkit (ALUT)
- Open Distributed Interactive Simulation (DIS)
- Open Dynamics Engine (ODE)
- OpenGL
- OpenSceneGraph (OSG)
- Physics Abstraction Layer (PAL)
- PLIB
- Perl Compatible Regular Expressions (PCRE)
- Xerces
- Zlib
