= PBO =

PBO may refer to:

== Government ==
- Parliamentary Budget Office, in the federal government of Australia
- Parliamentary Budget Officer, a Canadian civil servant

== Sciences ==
- Lead(II) oxide (PbO)
- Zylon, or Polybenzobisoxazole, a polymer
- Piperonyl butoxide, a pesticide synergist

== Places ==
- Peterborough railway station, Cambridgeshire, England (National Rail code: PBO)
- Paraburdoo Airport, Paraburdoo, Australia (IATA airport code: PBO)
- Pine Bluff Observatory, an astronomical observatory in Wisconsin, United States
- Plate Boundary Observatory, a geodetic observatory in the western United States
- Portland Bird Observatory, a wildlife observatory on the Isle of Portland, in Dorset, UK

== Computing ==
- Pixel buffer objects, used for asynchronous pixel transfer operations in OpenGL
- Precision Boost Overdrive, a technology by AMD for processor boosting

== Other uses ==
- Pinoy Box Office, a Filipino cable channel
- Public Benefit Organization, a type of charity or non-profit organization
- Philharmonia Baroque Orchestra, based in San Francisco, United States
- Push Button Objects, a producer of experimental hip-hop
