= Remo 3D =

3D computer graphics software

- Developer(s): Remograph
- Stable release: v3.2.1 / September 10, 2025; 0 days ago
- Operating system: Windows and Linux
- Type: 3D computer graphics
- License: Proprietary commercial software
- Website: www.remograph.com/products.php

Remo 3D is a 3D computer graphics software specialized in creating 3D models for realtime visualization. As opposed to many other 3D modeling products that are primarily intended for rendering. Remo 3D focuses on supporting realtime features like full control of the model scene graph, and modification of features like degrees-of-freedom nodes (DOF), levels-of-detail (LOD), switches, etc. Remo 3D's primary file format is OpenFlight and it allows for importing from and exporting to different file formats. This makes Remo 3D suitable for creating realtime 3D models intended for use in virtual reality software, simulators and computer games.

The product is developed by the Swedish company Remograph, and it has been on the market since 2005. It has users worldwide, both private and governmental, in defence and civil industries.

Remo 3D has been described in several independent articles, for instance at the vr-news and modsim sites, as well as in the Defence Management Journal

Remo 3D is developed using OpenSceneGraph, FLTK and scriptable using the Lua programming language.
