= Framebuffer object =

The framebuffer object (FBO) is an extension to OpenGL for flexibly rendering to off-screen buffers, including rendering to a texture buffer. It can be used to implement a large variety of image filters and post-processing effects, by rendering images to the off-screen buffer first, applying the effects, before sending them to the on-screen buffer.

The FBO is used in OpenGL for its efficiency and ease of use. The use of FBOs doesn't suffer from the overhead associated with OpenGL drawing context switching, and has largely superseded the pbuffer and other methods that use context switching.

The FBO is analogous to the render targets model in DirectX.

== Uses ==
The FBO has two main uses: The post-processing of rendered images and composition between different scenes. Some examples are:

1. The rendered image is captured and subjected to fragment shaders or other manipulations. This allows for many of today's popular computer graphics effects to be carried out, including the addition of a blurring or bloom effect.
2. Can be used to create views of other scenes, for example: a TV in a house showing the view from a secondary camera. A scene can be rendered through an FBO to a texture, then that texture can be applied to the surface of a TV. This is sometimes called "render to texture" or RTT.

== Advantages over other methods ==
Methods involving the FBO are considered superior because:

- It is easier to set up than most other methods.
- Does not require context switching.
- Is more efficient because resources are shared within the same context.
- Is more flexible because all of depth buffer, stencil buffer, etc. can be acquired.

== Architecture ==
To use an FBO one simply creates an instance of it. Along with the FBO come several attachments. One can then attach these to a chosen receiver: either a texture, or a render buffer. An FBO can expose multiple color attachment points (GL_COLOR_ATTACHMENT0 and up), and applications normally check that the chosen set of attachments is framebuffer-complete before rendering to it.

For example:

- Create an FBO and bind it.
- Attach the color buffer (either as a RenderBuffer or a texture) to the FBO.
- Attach the depth buffer (either as a RenderBuffer or a texture) to the FBO.
- Bind the native window FrameBuffer (id=0)
- Render the texture to screen with a pixel shader, dependent on both the Color information and depth information.
