= Luxology =

American graphics software company

- Industry: Software
- Products: 3D art software Modo

Luxology, LLC is a software company that creates 3D software products. One of its primary products is the 3D art software Modo. In September 2012, the company merged with The Foundry.

Before its merger with The Foundry, Luxology's Modo was known for several standout features that made it popular among 3D artists and designers in the early 2000s. The software was recognized for its innovative 3D modeling and rendering technology, as well as its user-friendly tools and community-driven approach.

Luxology's focus on creating artist-friendly tools and advanced technologies contributed to its popularity in various markets, including visual effects, design and games. The software was known for its speed and efficiency in handling 3D modeling, animation, texturing and rendering tasks.
