= LandXML =

File format for the exchange of civil engineering and land survey data

- Status: Published
- First published: 10 July 2000
- Latest version: 1.2; 2008-07-29
- Preview version: 2.0; 2014-07-20
- Organization: LandXML.org Industry Consortium
- Authors: Nathan Crews
- Base standards: XML
- Predecessor: AASHTO E-ASE ASCII
- Domain: Interchange of civil engineering and survey data
- Website: www.landxml.org

LandXML is an XML file format for interchange of civil engineering design and survey measurement data. It is the most common format for exchanging data on survey points, terrain and grading surfaces, road or rail geometries and pipe networks in infrastructure projects.

== Uses ==
The format has adopted by national surveys, research institutes and planning software vendors.

The standard ISO/TS 15143-4 defines a LandXML worksite data exchange format for earth-moving machinery and mobile road construction machinery.

== History ==
LandXML was launched in the year 2000 to facilitate vendor-neutral interchange and long-term storage of civil engineering and survey data. It was based on an earlier ASCII format called E-ASE by AASHTO.

The last official release, version 1.2 was published in 2008. A working draft for version 2.0 was published in 2014, but a final version has not been released as of 2025.
