= Spatial (platform) =

Social gaming platform

- Industry: Social gaming, virtual reality, augmented reality
- Founded: 2017
- Founder: Anand Agarawala (CEO); Jinha Lee (CPO)
- Headquarters: New York
- Key people: Jacob Loewenstein Charles Ju
- Number of employees: 51–200
- Website: spatial.io

Spatial is a Unity-powered UGC gaming platform that enables developers to publish and monetize multiplayer games across web, mobile, and VR. Spatial focuses on games developed using the Unity game engine and the C# programming language. The company is headquartered in New York.

== History ==
Spatial was co-founded by Anand Agarawala and Jinha Lee in 2017. The company designed its first product, the Spatial AR collaboration workspace, intended to transform how people work by turning any room into an infinitely augmentable workspace.

In 2019, Spatial entered into a partnership with Microsoft to develop workplace software for the HoloLens AR headset. The following year, it released a collaboration and hangout app that ran on Meta's Quest 2 VR headset. In 2021, Spatial pivoted to building virtual showrooms for NFTs.

Spatial has collaborated with various artists, including Hermitage, NBA, !llmind, Krista Kim, Federico Clapis, and Jarlan Perez. In March 2023, Spatial partnered with OVER, Decentraland, and UNXD at the second edition for Metaverse Fashion Week.

In November 2023, Spatial announced the launch of a new season of in-house games available to play on web, mobile, and VR.

Spatial has released several browser-based games on its platform, including Punch Hero, Racing Empire, Infinite Ascent, Shooty Shooty, Mostly Only Up, Buddy Blitz, and Cyber Punk.
