= HiCAD =

- Developer: ISD Software und Systeme GmbH
- Initial release: January 1, 1985; 41 years ago
- Stable release: HiCAD 2026 / October 30, 2025; 3 months ago
- Operating system: Windows
- Size: 6.9 GB
- Available in: English, German, Italian, Polish, Japanese, French
- Type: 3D computer graphics
- License: Proprietary
- Website: www.isdgroup.com/en/products/hicad.html

HiCAD is a 2D-/3D-CAD-system from ISD Software und Systeme GmbH based on the software kernel ESM (European Solid Modeller), developed by ISD.

HiCAD supports 2D design and 3D modeling. The construction method can also be freely selected between the parametric and feature-and the free and direct construction. In parametric design the construction work starts with the mental model construction, with all parameters and conditions. However, In free design changes can be made directly in the 3D model, without considering the history of a part.

== Applications ==
Mechanical product design and development, machine building and sheet metal applications, industrial and commercial steel structural constructions, piping and plant construction, metal construction and facades (industrial, glass, modular and rear-ventilated).

== Additions ==
Tools to automate repetitive tasks, to simulate, for photorealistic rendering.

== Interfaces ==
Interfaces include IFC, STEP, IGES, CATIA, Pro/E, Unigraphics, Inventor, SolidWorks, Parasolid, ACIS, DSTV, DWG, DXF, JT and V11.

== Company data ==
The company was founded in 1977. The headquarters and development facility are located in Dortmund, Germany. ISD has subsidiaries in Switzerland, the Netherlands, Austria, France, Japan and Italy. There are distributors in Germany, Italy, Scandinavia, India, and Korea.

Other products include: HELiOS (PDM) and Helicon (product configurator).

== See also ==
- Comparison of CAD editors for CAE
