= Akeytsu =

Akeytsu is a 3D animation and rigging software focused on the game development market. It was built to create large volumes of 3D animation with simple tools.

== History ==
Akeytsu is developed by the company Nukeygara, which was co-founded in 2014 in Lyon, France, by Aurélien Charrier. He is an animator with 12 years experience in the video game industry. His aim with Akeytsu was to build a feature set that was intuitive and easy to use. The beta version was found to be a simple focused tool concentrated on animation. Akeytsu was launched on Steam engine in 2016.

== Features ==
- Light rigging and skinning
- IK/FK
- One-click IK/FK reverse foot
- Rapid posing
- F-curves integrated with the viewport
- Rigging and animation any human or animal characters
- Onion skinning/ghosting
- Animation layers
- Cycle animation tools
- FBX import/export
