= Verto Studio 3D =

3D modelling program for mobile

- Developer: Michael L. Farrell
- Release: 2011
- Stable release: 2.5.0 / February 12, 2021
- Operating system: macOS, iOS Windows 10
- Type: Computer graphics
- License: Proprietary
- Website: https://www.vertostudio.com

Verto Studio 3D is a computer graphics program for 3D modelling, targeted at mobile content generation for touch devices. It is written using the Cocoa Touch API for iOS and using Cocoa for macOS. The product was initially released in 2011 for the iPad shortly after the device was released for 8 USD. It was later ported to VR and released to Steam on 20 July 2017.
