= AC3D =

- Developer(s): Inivis
- Stable release: 9.0 / April 27, 2022; 2 years ago
- Operating system: macOS, Linux, Microsoft Windows
- Type: 3D computer graphics
- License: Proprietary
- Website: www.inivis.com

AC3D is a 3D design program which has been available since 1994. The software is used by designers for modeling 3D graphics for games and simulations - most notably it is used by the scenery creators at Laminar Research on the X-Plane (simulator). The .ac format has also been used in FlightGear for scenery objects and aircraft models.

== History ==
Initially developed on the Amiga, the code was then ported to Silicon Graphics workstations which used the GL graphics library. At that time, the user interface was implemented using X11/Motif.

A Linux port was released onto the internet in 1994 (the GL graphics were replaced with OpenGL). A Microsoft Windows port followed when the X11 interface was dropped in favor of the portable Tcl/Tk scripting library.

In 2002, Inivis Limited purchased the full intellectual property rights to AC3D and continues to develop and market the software. They decided to keep the name AC3D for the software.

In 2005, a Mac OS X version of AC3D was released.

== Modeling ==
AC3D's modeling is polygon/subdivision-surface based. Unlike some other 3D software, AC3D refers to 'surfaces' rather than 'polygons'. An AC3D surface can be a polygon, polygon-outline or line. An AC3D object is a collection of surfaces.

== 3D files ==
AC3D can load and save a wide variety of 3D file formats but primarily uses its own .ac file format which is ascii.

Inivis is the first 3rd party vendor to offer officially sanctioned support for the Second Life sculpted prim format; exporters for other 3D software packages exist, but are solely user-supported.

== Scripting and plugins ==
Extra functionality can be added to AC3D via Tcl/Tk scripts and/or C/C++ dynamic libraries (plug-ins). A software development kit (SDK) is available to licensed users.
