= SpaceClaim =

Computer-aided design software

- Screenshot of SpaceClaim Engineer displaying a multi-body part (center) and the ribbon interface (top)
- Developer: SpaceClaim Corporation
- Initial release: April 1, 2007
- Stable release: 2024.R2 / July 23, 2024; 22 months ago
- Operating system: Windows
- Type: CAD
- License: Proprietary
- Website: spaceclaim.com Spaceclaim has expired, replaced by Ansys Discovery 2025 R1

SpaceClaim is a solid modeling CAD (computer-aided design) software that runs on Microsoft Windows and developed by SpaceClaim Corporation. The company is headquartered in Concord, Massachusetts.

SpaceClaim Corporation was founded in 2005 to develop 3D solid modeling software for mechanical engineering. Its first CAD application was launched in 2007 and used an approach to solid modeling where design concepts are created by pulling, moving, filling, combining, and reusing 3D shapes.

It was acquired by Ansys in May 2014, Inc, and was integrated in subsequent versions of Ansys Simulation packages as a built-in 3D modeler.

SpaceClaim Corporation markets SpaceClaim Engineer directly to end-user and indirectly by other channels. SpaceClaim also licenses its software for OEMs, such as ANSYS, Flow International Corporation, CatalCAD.

== Modeling technology ==
SpaceClaim's 3D direct modeling technology is primarily expressed through its user interface in four tools: pull, move, fill, and combine:

- Pull contains most creation features found in traditional CAD systems, determining its behavior through users’ selection and though the use of secondary tool guides. For example, using the Pull tool on a face by default offsets the face, but using the Pull tool on an edge rounds the edge.
- Move repositions components and geometry, and can also be used to create patterns (often called arrays).
- Fill primarily removes geometry from a part by extending geometry to fill in the surrounding area. Popular uses include deleting rounds and holes from a model. SpaceClaim Engineer also includes more specialized tools for model preparation.
- Combine performs boolean and splitting operations, such as merging parts and subtracting parts from each other.

These functions were developed in the modelling kernel ACIS licensed to SpaceClaim by Dassault Systèmes.

== History ==
In September 2005, Mike Payne, Danny Dean, David Taylor, and Blake Courter founded SpaceClaim Corporation. Mike Payne was previously a founder of PTC and SolidWorks, CTO of Dassault Systèmes, and COO of Spatial. On April 1, 2007, SpaceClaim released SpaceClaim 2007 Professional, its first commercial release.

On September 30, 2008, Chris Randles become CEO and Mike Payne become chairman of the board.

On July 21, 2009, SpaceClaim announced support for multi-touch hardware.

On April 29, 2014, technical software company ANSYS (NASDAQ: ANSS) acquired SpaceClaim for $85 million in cash, plus considerations. . ANSYS is specialized in developing software for product development simulation and analysis, and has sold a version of SpaceClaim (named ANSYS SpaceClaim Direct Modeler) as an option for its CAE software since 2009.

=== Release history ===
| Name/Version | Release date |
|---|---|
| SpaceClaim 2007 Professional | April 1, 2007 |
| SpaceClaim 2007+ Professional | November 15, 2007 |
| SpaceClaim 2008 Professional | April 4, 2008 |
| SpaceClaim Engineer 2009 | February 13, 2009 |
| SpaceClaim Engineer 2009+ | November 18, 2009 |
| SpaceClaim Engineer 2010 | August 6, 2010 |
| SpaceClaim Engineer 2011 | January 18, 2011 |
| SpaceClaim Engineer 2012 | March 20, 2012 |
| SpaceClaim Engineer 2012+ | October 10, 2012 |
| SpaceClaim Engineer 2014 | December 10, 2013 |
| ANSYS SpaceClaim 2015 | November 19, 2014 |
| ANSYS SpaceClaim 2016 | December 20, 2016 |
| ANSYS SpaceClaim 2017 | March 18, 2017 |
| ANSYS SpaceClaim 19.0 | February 8, 2018RR |

== See also ==
- Comparison of CAD software
- Comparison of CAD editors for CAE
