= Pixel buffer =

Term

Pixel buffer or pBuffer is a feature in OpenGL and OpenGL ES platform interfaces which allows for off-screen rendering. It is specified as an extension to WGL API, and a core feature of GLX & EGL.

When using pBuffers, a user can bind an OpenGL context to offscreen surfaces, effectively allowing for off-screen rendering to a default framebuffer, allocated by OpenGL itself.

The pBuffer functionality has been superseded by the usage of FBOs (Framebuffer Objects). However, pBuffers can be still used with modern OpenGL drivers.

pBuffers should not be confused with Pixel buffer objects (also named PBOs), which are non-renderable buffers containing raw pixel data.

== See also ==
- Framebuffer Object
- Pixel buffer objects
