= Cheetah3D =

Computer graphics program for 3D modelling, animation and rendering

- Developer: Dr. Martin Wengenmayer
- Release: December 1, 2003; 22 years ago
- Stable release: 8.0 / January 26, 2024; 2 years ago
- Operating system: macOS 10.8.5 or later
- Type: 3D computer graphics
- License: Proprietary
- Website: www.cheetah3d.com

Cheetah3D is a computer graphics program for 3D modelling, animation and rendering. It is written in Cocoa for macOS. The program is aimed at beginning and amateur 3D artists.

It offers a number of medium and high-end features in conjunction with an intuitive user interface. Its simplicity is what makes it stand apart from other programs.

It was initially released in 2003 and is currently available on Apple Silicon Mac (M1, M2 and M3 etc.)-based Mac computers. A single user license is $79 US. A free demo version is available, with the limitation of the ability to save or export models.

== Features ==
Cheetah3D is aimed primarily at amateur artists, and so focuses on providing features for creating simple 3D scenes. Its selection of features is narrow but focused to add in its usefulness and simplicity.

It supports a variety of geometric primitives, including polygon meshes and Bézier curves. Its features also allow for box modeling with subdivision surfaces In addition, it has some simple animation support, including spline-based camera paths and targeted objects, skeletal deformations, morph targets, and subdivision surfaces, making its character animation effective.

The program also has several advanced rendering settings, which allow for antialiasing, raytraced shadows, depth of field, HDRI, ambient occlusion, caustics lighting, soft shadowing and photon-mapped caustics.

Many common 3D file formats are supported, including 3ds, obj, sia, and FBX. Media produced by the program can also be used in Unity, which is a game development tool.

Cheetah3D 5.0 was released on 8 October 2009 and requires at least Mac OS X v10.4. This was also the last version to support the PowerPC. Features include a node-based material system, an improved render engine, new modelling tools such as a bevel tool and a bend modifier, and Collada file format support. Official video tutorials Cheetah3D for Beginners are currently available based on this version.

Cheetah3D 6.0 was released on 13 April 2012 and requires Mac OS X v10.6 or later. Added features include Bullet Physics integration including rigid body and soft body simulation and integration with the existing particle system, isosurfaces, and support for Mac OS X Lion. A third-party manual Learn 3D With Cheetah 3D was released simultaneously with this version.

Cheetah3D 6.0.1 - 6.3.2 were released between 26 July 2012 and 28 September 2014. Added features include support for Mac OS X Mountain Lion, Retina Display support, support for spline IK, improved Ring and Loop selection, ABF unwrapping, and an added split joint tool. Also included are improved Mac OS X Mavericks compatibility & support for GateKeeper v2 signatures.

Cheetah3d 7 Beta was released on 1 May 2016. It added a UI update, a new renderer, NGon Booleans, movie textures, soft selections, Collada support, layers, motion blur for frame sequences (via the new renderer) and more.

Cheetah3d 7.0 was released in October of 2017.

Cheetah3D 8.0 was released in January 2024. Updates included native support for Apple Silicon Mac (M1, M2 and M3 etc.). Cheetah3D 8.0 also switched from OpenGL to the Apple Metal 3D API. This switch to Metal also resulted in a GPU-accelerated 3D viewer for real-time previews.
