= Modo (software) =

3D graphics software

MODO (software)
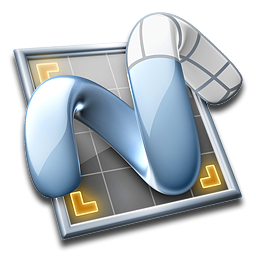
- Developer: The Foundry Visionmongers
- Stable release: 17.1 / 26 November 2024; 19 months ago
- Operating system: Windows, Linux, macOS
- Type: 3D computer graphics
- License: Trialware
- Website: www.foundry.com/products/modo

Modo (stylized as MODO, and originally modo) is a discontinued polygon and subdivision surface modeling, sculpting, 3D painting, animation and rendering package developed by Luxology, LLC, which is now merged with and known as The Foundry. The program incorporates features such as n-gons and edge weighting, and runs on Microsoft Windows, Linux and macOS platforms.

== History ==
Modo was created by the same core group of software engineers that previously created the pioneering 3D application LightWave 3D, originally developed on the Amiga platform and bundled with the Amiga-based Video Toaster workstations that were popular in television studios in the late 1980s and early 1990s. They are based in Mountain View, California.

In 2001, senior management at NewTek (makers of LightWave) and their key LightWave engineers disagreed regarding the notion for a complete rewrite of LightWave's work-flow and technology. NewTek's Vice President of 3D Development, Brad Peebler, eventually left Newtek to form Luxology, and was joined by Allen Hastings and Stuart Ferguson (the lead developers of Lightwave), along with some of the LightWave programming team members (Arnie Cachelin, Matt Craig, Greg Duquesne, Yoshiaki Tazaki).

After more than three years of development work, Modo was demonstrated at SIGGRAPH 2004 and released in September of the same year. In April 2005, the high-end visual effects studio Digital Domain integrated Modo into their production pipeline. Other studios to adopt Modo include Pixar, Industrial Light & Magic, Zoic Studios, id Software, Eden FX, Studio ArtFX, The Embassy Visual Effects, Naked Sky Entertainment and Spinoff Studios.

Modo 201 was the winner of the Apple Design Awards for Best Use of Mac OS X Graphics for 2006. In October 2006, Modo also won "Best 3D/Animation Software" from MacUser magazine. In January 2007, Modo won the Game Developer Frontline Award for "Best Art Tool".

Modo was used in the production of feature films such as Stealth, Ant Bully, Iron Man, and Wall-E.

On November 7, 2024, Foundry announced the decision to discontinue the development of Modo.

== Workflow ==
Modo's workflow differs substantially from many other mainstream 3D applications. While Maya and 3ds Max stress using the right tool for the job, Modo artists typically use a much smaller number of basic tools and combine them to create new tools using the Tool Pipe and customizable action centers and falloffs. Later, Modo 10.1 added a non-destructive procedural modeling workflow built around a mesh operator stack, letting artists reorder modeling operations and keep edits live.

=== Action centers ===
Modo allows an artist to choose the "pivot point" of a tool or action in realtime simply by clicking somewhere. Thus, Modo avoids making the artist invoke a separate "adjust pivot point" mode. In addition, the artist can tell Modo to derive a tool's axis orientation from the selected or clicked on element, bypassing the needs for a separate "adjust tool axis" mode.

=== Falloffs ===
Any tool can be modified with customizable falloff, which modifies its influence and strength according to geometric shapes. Radial falloff will make the current tool affect elements in the center of a resizable sphere most strongly, while elements at the edges will be barely affected at all. Linear falloff will make the tool affect elements based on a gradient that lies along a user-chosen line, etc.

== 3D painting ==
Modo allows an artist to paint directly onto 3D models and even paint instances of existing meshes onto the surface of an object. The paint system allows users to use a combination of tools, brushes and inks to achieve many different paint effects and styles.

== Renderer ==
Modo's renderer is multi-threaded and scales nearly linearly with the addition of processors or processor cores. That is, an 8-core machine will render a given image approximately eight times as fast as a single-core machine with the same per-core speed. Modo runs on up to 32 cores and offers the option of network rendering.

Modo's renderer is a physically based ray-tracer. It includes features like caustics, dispersion, stereoscopic rendering, Fresnel effects, subsurface scattering, blurry refractions (e.g. frosted glass), volumetric lighting (smokey bar effect), and Pixar-patented Deep Shadows.
