= Form-Z =

Form·Z is a general-purpose solid and surface modeling software. It offers 2D/3D form manipulating and sculpting capabilities. It can be used on Windows and Macintosh computers. It is available in English, German, Italian, Spanish, French, Greek, Korean and Japanese languages.

== Modeling ==
Form·Z allows design in 3D or in 2D, using numeric or interactive graphic input through either line or smooth shaded drawings (OpenGL).

Modeling features include Boolean solids to generate complex composite objects; the ability to create curved surfaces from splines, including NURBS and Bézier/Coons patches; mechanical and organic forms using the previous as well as metaforms, patches, subdivisions, displacements, or skinning, plus tools such as Terrain models, Platonic solids, geodesic spheres, double line/wall objects, staircases, helixes, screws, and bolts. In addition, Form·Z supports 3D transforming and morphing, and animated shape capture.

Technical output oriented modeling allows to refine the design with double precision CAD accuracy to full structural detail for 3D visualization for the production of 2D construction drawings, 3D printing, rapid prototyping, and CNC milling. It has information management of bills of materials and spreadsheet support for construction documents.

== Version history ==
2019	form•Z v9 released 9.0.2 Mar 2020; form•Z project files (.fmz, .fml) broke compatibility with form•Z v8 files; Files sizes > 2 GB; Better performance; Better texture cache (uses less space, faster), faster autosave, file size optimization; Reference files added; Symmetry Added for Object, nurBs, subD's; File formats enhanced for Sketchup 2020, DXF/DWG/DWF, STEP and PSD (direct); FormZ Draft has been redesigned for 2D drafting and page layout; File scripting using Python 2.7 (which is now end-of-life and unsupported)

== Animation ==
Form·Z offers an animation environment where objects, lights, cameras, and surface styles (colors) can be animated and transformed. Animation features are object-centric and are applied as modeling operations that support animated visualizations, dynamic modeling and form creation.

== Rendering ==
RenderZone Plus provides photorealistic rendering with global illumination based on final gather (raytrace), ambient occlusion, and radiosity, for advanced simulation of lighting effects and rendering techniques. Scene illumination considers the accurate distribution of light in the environment.

Key rendering features include multiple light types (distant (sun), cone, point, projector, area, custom, line, environment, and atmospheric) whereas the environment and atmospheric lights are optimized for global illumination. Both procedural and pre-captured textures are offered and can be mapped onto object surfaces using six different mapping methods: flat, cubic, cylindrical, spherical, parametric, or UV coordinates. Decals can be attached on top of other surface styles to produce a variety of rendering effects, such as labels on objects, graffiti on walls, partially reflective surfaces, masked transparencies, and more. State of the art shaders are used to render surfaces and other effects. A surface style is defined by up to four layers of shaders, which produce color, reflections, transparency, and bump effects. They can be applied independently or can be correlated. Libraries with many predefined materials are included and can be extended/customized.

A sketch rendering mode produces non photorealistic images that appear as if they were drawn by manual rendering techniques, such as oil painting, water color, or pencil hatches.

=== Third-party rendering plugins ===
Maxwell

Maxwell 5 is a rendering engine developed by NextLimit based on light physics. The Maxwell plugin allows for the assignment of Maxwell materials to form·Z objects with fast visual rendered feedback using Maxwell FIRE. Once the materials are established, the plugin transfers the scene including objects, lights and the viewing parameters to Maxwell for rendering. Maxwell 5 uses CPU and or GPU* hardware and has access to cloud-based rendering internally.

V-Ray

V-Ray is a rendering engine developed by Chaos Labs & austodessys using CPU and/or GPU (PC hardware with Nvidia CUDA-based GPU cards.). The V-Ray plugin allows for the assignment of V-Ray materials to form·Z objects. Once the materials are established, the plugin transfers the scene including objects, lights interactive or progressive rendering.

== Popular culture ==
Form•Z and RenderZone Plus claim to be used in Hollywood productions, in and behind the scenes (set design pre-production and construction, miniature model design, pre-vis animation, CG special effects, post-production etc.).

Productions include: Ocean's Eleven, Pirates of the Caribbean, Planet of the Apes, Reign of Fire, Space Cowboys, Solaris, Star Trek Into Darkness, Terminator 3 and Transformers. Form-Z was used by ILM's visual effects supervisor John Knoll to create the shot of the Enterprise-D going to warp in Star Trek: Generations, the first time CGI rather than a model had been used to create starship shots in a Star Trek movie.

== See also ==
- CAD
- 3D computer graphics software
- 3D modeling
- Comparison of CAD editors for AEC

== Literature ==
Pierluigi Serraino: History of form Z, Birkhäuser, 2002, ISBN 3-7643-6563-3
