= Clara.io =

3D computer graphics software

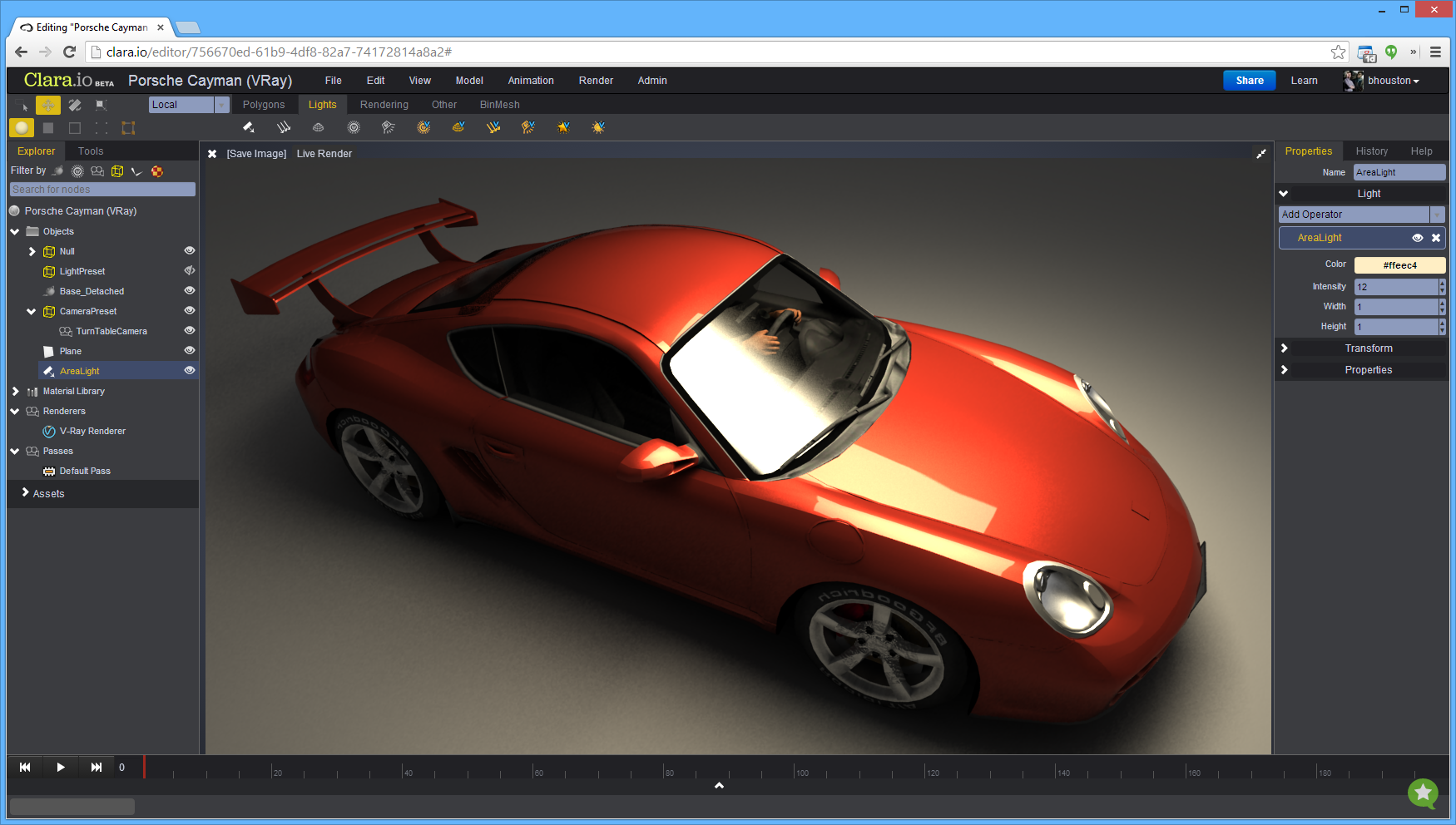
- Clara.io with a V-Ray rendering of Porsche Cayman 3D model
- Website type: 3D computer graphics software
- Available in: English
- Owner: Exocortex
- Website: clara.io
- Commercial: Yes, Freemium
- Registration: Required
- Users: 85,000+
- Launched: 9 June 2013; 13 years ago
- Current status: Online (Abandoned)
- Content license: Creative Commons
- Written in: JavaScript

Clara.io was web-based freemium 3D computer graphics software developed by Exocortex, a Canadian software company, active from 2013-2022. The free or "Basic" component of their freemium offering, however, placed severe restrictions, such as on saving models and importing texture maps.

== History ==
Clara.io was announced in July 2013, and first presented as part of the official SIGGRAPH 2013 program later that month. By November 2013, when the open beta period started, Clara.io had 14,000 registered users. Clara.io claimed to have 26,000 registered users in January 2014, which grew to 85,000 by December 2014 and 100,000 by 2015. Clara.io was permanently shut down on December 31, 2022. As of the closing date, it had over 500,000 low-poly 3D models available for download.

The developer, Exocortex, rebranded as "ThreeKit" to produce a 3D product configurator for e-commerce websites. The company raised a Series B funding round in 2021 in connection with the shift.

== Features ==
- Polygonal modeling
- Constructive solid geometry
- Key frame animation
- Skeletal animation
- Hierarchical scene graph
- Texture mapping
- Photorealistic rendering (streaming cloud rendering using V-Ray Cloud)
- Scene publishing via HTML iframe embedding
- FBX, Collada, OBJ, STL and Three.js import/export
- Collaborative real-time editing
- Revision control (versioning & history)
- Scripting, Plugins & REST APIs
- 3D model library
- Unlisted and Private scenes (paid subscriptions only).

== Technology ==
Clara.io is developed using HTML5, JavaScript, WebGL and Three.js. Clara.io does not rely on any browser plugins and thus runs on any platform that has a modern standards compliant browser.

== Screenshots ==
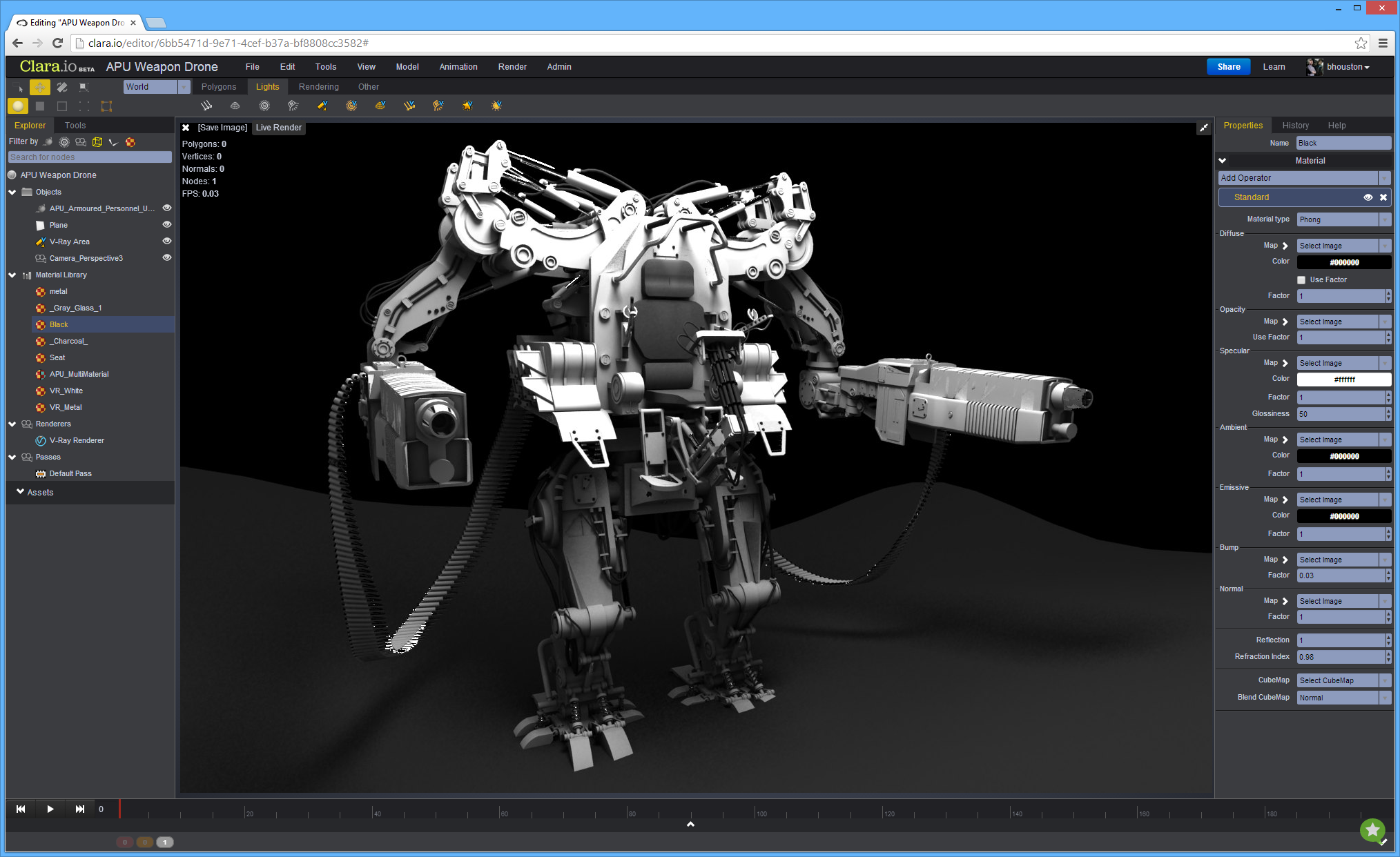
A V-Ray rendering of an APU Drone 3D model

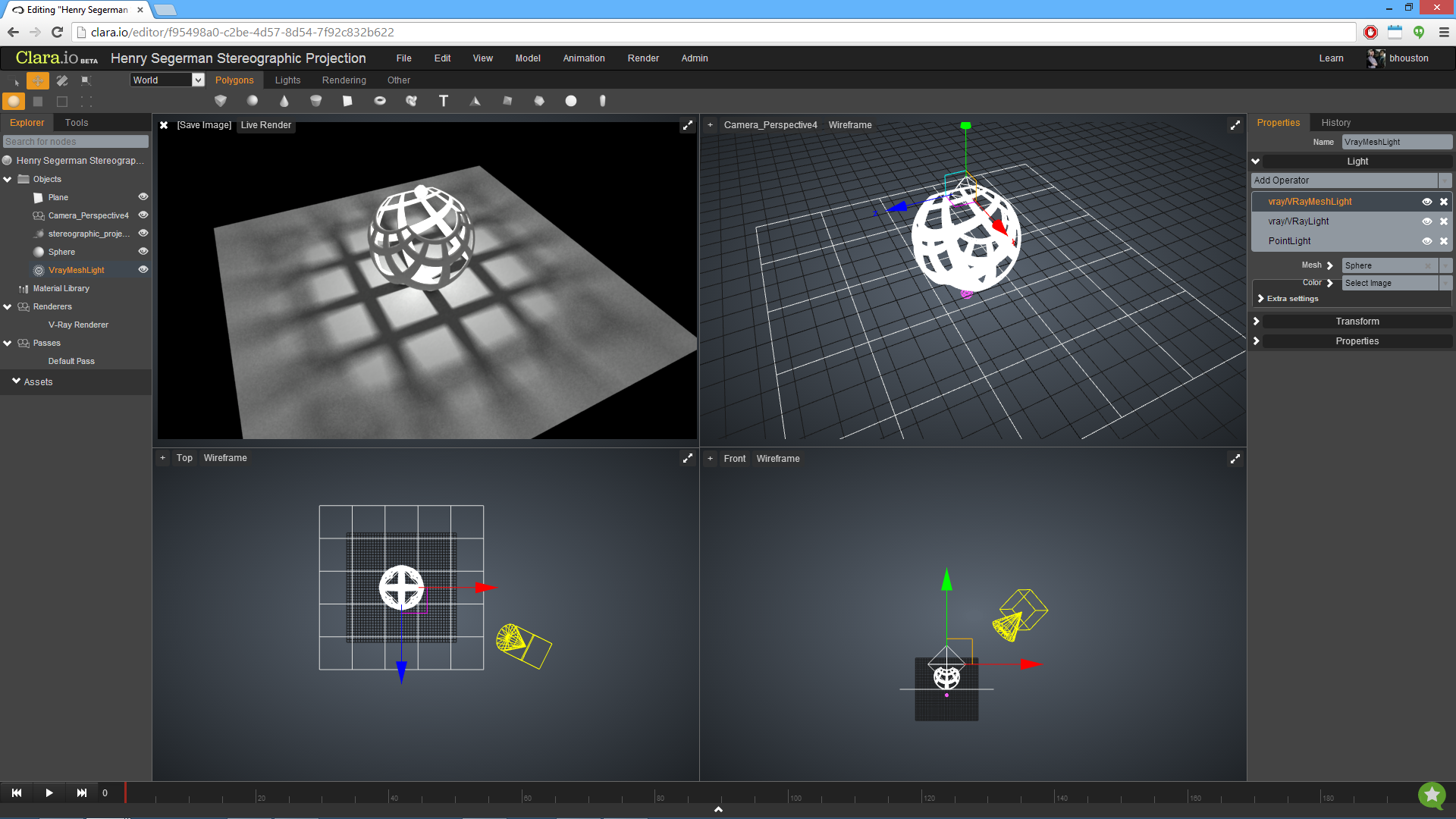
4-panel editor interface.

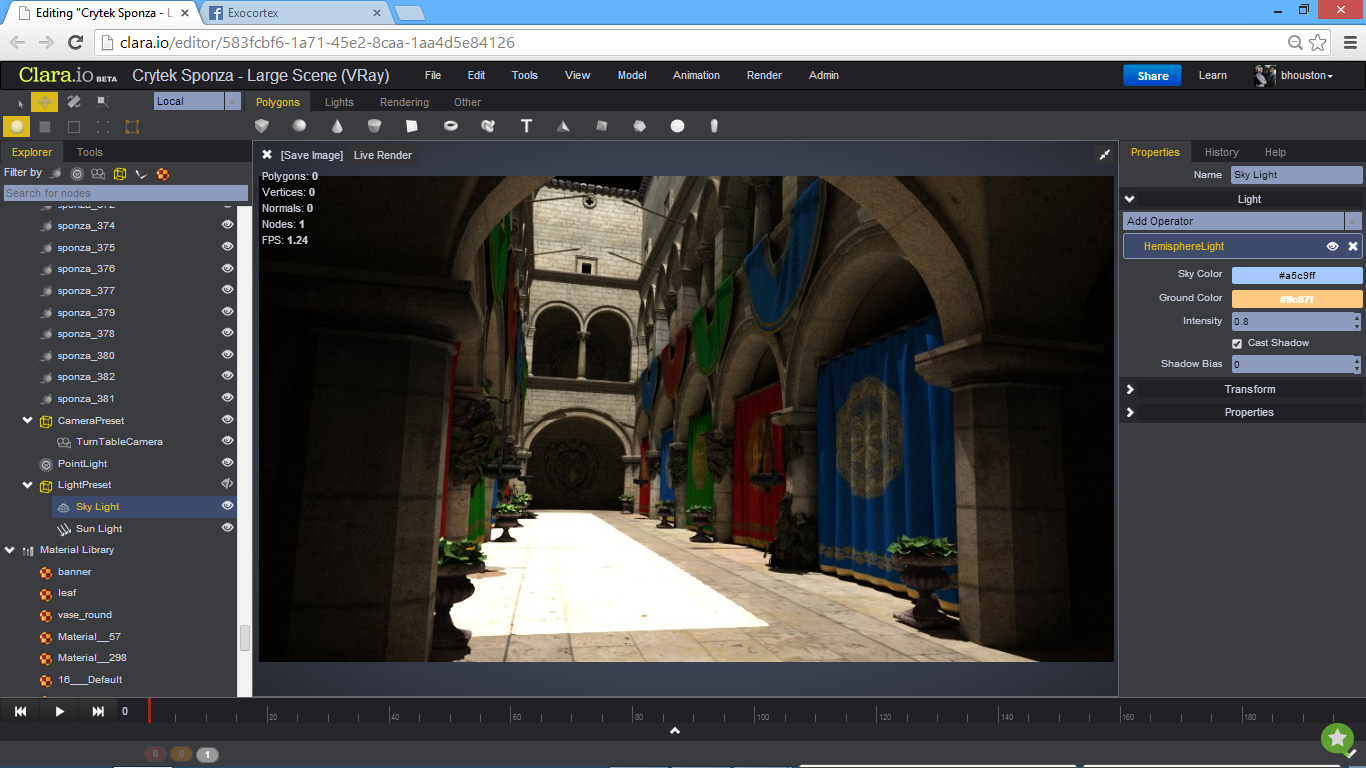
V-Ray rendering of the standard Sponza Atrium model.

== See also ==
- 3D modeling
- Sketchfab
- SketchUp
