= OpenFlight =

3D scene description file format

OpenFlight geometry format
- Filename extension: .flt
- Internet media type: model/flt
- Developed by: Presagis
- Initial release: 1988
- Latest release: 16.8; December 2021; 4 years ago
- Type of format: 3D file formats

OpenFlight (or .flt) is a 3d geometry model file format originally developed by Software Systems Inc. for its MultiGen real-time 3d modeling package in 1988. Originally called Flight, the format was designed as a nonproprietary 3d model format for use by real-time 3d visual simulation image generators. The format was later renamed to OpenFlight to denote its nonproprietary image generation (IG) usage. The MultiGen modeling package (known now as Creator) and the OpenFlight format were rapidly adopted by the early commercial flight simulation industry in the later 1980s and early 1990s. NASA Ames was the first customer for the MultiGen modeling package.

The early advantage OpenFlight held over many 3d geometry model file formats (.obj, .dxf, .3ds) was its specific real-time 3d graphics industry design. This means that the format is polygon based (rather than NURB surfaces), and provides a real-time tree structure essential for real-time IG systems. Most early graphics file formats, such as Wavefront Technologies, or Alias Systems Corporation, tried to focus more on visual aesthetics for non-real-time based rendering graphics packages.

The OpenFlight file format is still widely used today in the high end real-time visual simulation industry as the standard interchange format between different IG systems, and is currently administrated by Presagis.

== File format ==
=== Associated File Formats ===
OpenFlight models can have several associated files in different formats, that define elements such as material characteristics or shaders.

== Versions and History ==
Version	Date	Information
OpenFlight 16.8	December 2021; 4 years ago	OpenFlight Scene Specification for version 16.8 Covering: Presagis Creator Suite 20
OpenFlight 16.7	November 2018; 7 years ago	OpenFlight Scene Specification for version 16.7 Covering: Presagis Creator Suite 18
OpenFlight 16.6	January 2017; 9 years ago	OpenFlight Scene Specification for version 16.6 Covering: Presagis Creator Suite 16
OpenFlight 16.5	February 2016; 10 years ago	OpenFlight Scene Specification for version 16.5 Covering: Presagis Creator Suite 15
OpenFlight 16.4	June 2009; 17 years ago	OpenFlight Scene Specification for version 16.4 Covering: Presagis Creator v4.0
OpenFlight 16.3	January 2008; 18 years ago	OpenFlight Scene Specification for version 16.3 Covering: Presagis Creator v3.4
OpenFlight 16.2	January 2007; 19 years ago	OpenFlight Scene Specification for version 16.2 Covering: MultiGen-Paradigm Creator v3.2
OpenFlight 16.1	October 2005; 20 years ago	OpenFlight Scene Specification for version 16.1 Covering: MultiGen-Paradigm Creator v3.1
OpenFlight 16.0	December 2004; 21 years ago	OpenFlight Scene Specification for version 16.0 Covering: MultiGen-Paradigm Creator v3.0
OpenFlight 15.8	May 2003; 23 years ago	OpenFlight Scene Specification for version 15.8 Covering: MultiGen-Paradigm Creator v2.6
OpenFlight 15.7	January 2001; 25 years ago	OpenFlight Scene Specification for version 15.7 Covering: MultiGen-Paradigm Creator v2.4; v2.4.1; v2.5; v2.5.1
OpenFlight 15.6	September 1999; 26 years ago	OpenFlight Scene Specification for version 15.6 Covering: MultiGen-Paradigm Creator v2.1; v2.2; v2.2.1; v2.3
OpenFlight 15.5.1	July 1998; 27 years ago	OpenFlight Scene Specification for version 15.5.1 Covering: MultiGen Creator v2.0; v2.0.1
OpenFlight 15.4.1	July 1998; 27 years ago	OpenFlight Scene Specification for version 15.4.1 Covering: MultiGen II v1.4; v1.5
OpenFlight 15.0	October 1996; 29 years ago	OpenFlight Scene Specification for version 15.0 Covering: MultiGen II v1.2 GameGen II v1.0 GameGen v1.2
OpenFlight 14.2	May 1995; 31 years ago	OpenFlight Scene Specification for version 14.2 Covering: MultiGen II v1.0 MultiGen v14.2; v14.3
Flight 13.0	June 1993; 33 years ago	Flight Scene Specification for version 13.0 Covering: Software Systems MultiGen version 13
Flight 12.0	December 1992; 33 years ago	Flight Scene Specification for version 12.0 Covering: Software Systems MultiGen version 12
Flight 11.0	March 1992; 34 years ago	Flight Scene Specification for version 11.0 Covering: Software Systems MultiGen version 11
Flight 10.0	April 1991; 35 years ago	Flight Scene Specification for version 10.0 Covering: Software Systems MultiGen version 10
Flight 9.0 A	March 1991; 35 years ago	Flight Scene Specification for version 9.0 Covering: Software Systems MultiGen version 9
Flight 1.0	1988; 38 years ago	Flight Scene Specification for version 1.0 Covering: Software Systems MultiGen

== Modeling Tools ==
There are several modeling tools currently on the market that both read and write the OpenFlight file format. The standard bearer of the file format Presagis Creator offers the widest compatibility with the file format. Another modeling tool using OpenFlight as its native format in Remo 3D from Remograph. Blender previously had integrated support for importing models in OpenFlight format. However, it appears as though this functionality has been abandoned in newer versions and there is currently no support for exporting to this format. Autodesk 3DS Max still supports exporting to OpenFlight format as of the 2024 version of their software. Carbon Graphics' Geo STUDIO is also very active in developing its OpenFlight version and feature support (currently standing at 16.8).

=== Vendor specific alterations ===
Because the OpenFlight file format allows for vendor specific data field additions, some modeling and simulation tools might not fully support vendor specific additions to the file format.
