= List of 3D computer graphics software =

This list of 3D graphics software contains software packages related to the development and exploitation of 3D computer graphics. For a comparison, see Comparison of 3D computer graphics software.

== 0–9 ==
- 123D is Autodesk's entry into the hobbyist 3D modelling market.
- 3D-Coat is a digital sculpting program specializing in voxel and polygonal sculpting.
- 3Delight, also known as 3Delight^{NSI}, is a path tracing renderer based on its NSI API and OSL.
- 3DCrafter (previously known as 3D Canvas) is a 3D modeling and animation tool available in a freeware version as well as paid versions (3D Canvas Plus and 3D Canvas Pro).
- 3ds Max (Autodesk), originally called 3D Studio MAX, is a comprehensive and versatile 3D application used in film, television, video games, and architecture for Windows and Macintosh (but only running via Parallels or other VM software). It can be extended and customized through its SDK or scripting using a Maxscript. It can use third-party rendering options such as Brazil R/S, finalRender and V-Ray.

== A ==
- AC3D (Inivis) is a 3D modeling application that began in the 1990s on the Amiga. Used in a number of industries, MathWorks actively recommends it in many of their aerospace-related articles due to price and compatibility. AC3D does not feature its own renderer, but can generate output files for both RenderMan and POV-Ray, among others.
- Adobe After Effects (Adobe) is a digital visual effects, motion graphics, and compositing application used in the post-production process of filmmaking and television production.
- Aladdin4D (DiscreetFX), first created for the Amiga, was originally developed by Adspec Programming. After acquisition by DiscreetFX, it is multi-platform for OS X, Amiga OS 4.1, MorphOS, Linux, AROS and Windows.
- Amiga Reflections is a 3D modeling and rendering software developed by Carsten Fuchs for the Amiga.
- Anim8or is a proprietary freeware 3D rendering and animation package.
- Animation:Master from HASH, Inc is a modeling and animation package that focuses on ease of use. It is a spline-based modeler. Its strength lies in character animation.
- Aqsis is a free and open-source rendering suite compliant with the RenderMan standard.

== B ==
- Blender (Blender Foundation) is a free, open source, 3D studio for animation, modeling, rendering, and texturing offering a feature set comparable to commercial 3D animation suites. It is developed under the GPL and is available on all major platforms including Windows, OS X, Linux, BSD, and Solaris.
- BRL-CAD is an open source solid modeling computer-aided design system with interactive geometry editing, ray-tracing for rendering and geometric analysis, network-distributed framebuffer display support, and image and signal processing tools. It supports a myriad of geometry representation types including boundary representation (BREP) NURBS, triangle and polygonal models, volumetric data visualization, and efficient implicit constructive solid geometry (CSG). It's been under continuous active development since 1984.
- Brazil R/S is a rendering engine for 3ds Max, Rhino and VIZ.
- Bryce (DAZ Productions) is most famous for landscapes and creating 'painterly' renderings, as well as its unique user interface. Daz3d has stopped its development and it is not compatible with MAC OS 10.7x or higher. It is currently being given away for free via the daz3d website.

== C ==
- Carrara (Daz Productions) is a 3D complete tool set package for 3D modeling, texturing animation and rendering.
- CATIA is CAD/CAE/CAM software from Dassault Systèmes for 3D modeling, texturing, animation and rendering.
- Cheetah3D is a proprietary program for Macintosh computers primarily aimed at amateur 3D artists with some medium and high-end features.
- Cinema 4D (MAXON) is a light (Prime) to full-featured (Studio) 3d package dependent on version used. Although used in film usually for 2.5d work, Cinema's largest user base is in the television motion graphics and design/visualisation arenas. Originally developed for the Amiga, it is also available for OS X and Windows.
- CityEngine (Procedural Inc) is a 3D modeling application specialized in the generation of three-dimensional urban environments. With the procedural modeling approach, CityEngine enables the efficient creation of detailed large-scale 3D city models, it is available for OS X, Windows and Linux.
- Clara.io (Exocortex) is a 3D polygon modeling, solid constructive geometry, animation, and rendering package that runs in any web browser that supports WebGL. It supports collaborative real-time editing and revision control. It supports format conversions as well to popular web-formats including Three.js, and Babylon.js.
- CloudCompare is an open source 3D point cloud editing and processing software.
- Cobalt is a parametric-based Computer-aided design (CAD) and 3D modeling software for both the Macintosh and Microsoft Windows. It integrates wireframe, freeform surfacing, feature-based solid modeling and photo-realistic rendering (see Ray tracing), and animation.

== D ==
- Daz Studio a free 3D rendering toolset for adjusting parameters of pre-existing models, posing and rendering them in full 3D scene environments. Imports objects created in Poser and is similar to that program, but with fewer features.
- DX Studio a complete integrated development environment for creating interactive 3D graphics. The system comprises both a real-time 3D engine and a suite of editing tools, and is the first product to offer a complete range of tools in a single IDE.

== E ==
- Electric Image Animation System (EIAS3D) is a 3D animation and rendering package available on both OS X and Windows. Mostly known for its rendering quality and rendering speed it does not include a built-in modeler. The popular film Pirates of the Caribbean and the television series Lost used the software.
- Element 3D is third party after effects plugin developed by Video Copilot.^{[2]} it is a 64 bit plugin that run in both Win/Mac os. It is used for importing/creating 3d objects and for particle rendering. It is mostly used for motion design and visual effects. It can do professional work in much less time according to its simple interface and presets, that it was designed for easier workflow, user friendly and final results.

== F ==
- FaceGen is a source of human face models for other programs. Users are able to generate face models either randomly or from input photographs.
- FreeCAD is a full-featured CAD/CAE open-source software. Python scripting and various plugin modules are supported, e.g. CAM, Robotics, Meshing and FEM.
- form•Z (AutoDesSys, Inc.) is a general-purpose solid/surface 3D modeler. Its primary use is for modeling, but it also features photo-realistic rendering and object-centric animation support. form•Z is used in architecture, interior design, illustration, product design, and set design. It supports plug-ins and scripts, has import/export capabilities and was first released in 1991. It is currently available for both OS X and Windows.

== G ==
- Gelato is a hardware-accelerated, non-real-time renderer created by graphics card manufacturer NVIDIA.
- GigaMesh Software Framework is a tool for analyzing high-resolution 3D-measurement data focused on applications in forensic sciences like archaeology. It is known for robust visualization and extraction of features like weathered inscriptions or faint fingerprints.
- Gmax is a deprecated lightweight freeware edition of Autodesk 3ds Max originally developed for hobbyists and game content creation. It was discontinued in 2005, but As of December 2013, it is still available for download.
- Grome is a 3D environment editor for terrain, water, and vegetation suitable for games and other 3D real-time applications.

== H ==
- Hexagon (Daz Productions) is a 3D subdivision modeler with an emphasis on organic modeling.
- Houdini (Side Effects Software) is used for visual effects and character animation. It was used in Disney's feature film The Wild. Houdini uses a non-standard interface that it refers to as a "NODE system". It has a hybrid micropolygon-raytracer renderer, Mantra, but it also has built-in support for commercial renderers like Pixar's RenderMan and Mental Ray.

== I ==
- iClone (Reallusion Inc.) is a stand-alone, real-time 3D animation software used in previsualization, video games, Machinima, and story-telling, that specializes in quick facial and body animation. iClone provides a global library of template-based content and a collection of animation tools including a motion capturing plug-in, and content exporting capabilities to other 3D applications and game engines.
- Imagine (3D modeling software)
- Infini-D from Specular International.
- Inventor (Autodesk) The Autodesk Inventor is for 3D mechanical design, product simulation, tooling creation, and design communication.

== K ==
- Kerkythea is a freeware rendering system that supports raytracing. It can be integrated with 3ds Max, Blender, SketchUp, and Silo (generally any software that can export files in obj and 3ds formats). Kerkythea is a standalone renderer, using physically accurate materials and lighting.
- KernelCAD is a large component aimed to present CAD as a GUI element for programming engineers. Includes interface to Open CASCADE.

== L ==
- LightWave 3D (Lightwave Digital), first developed for the Amiga, was originally bundled as part of the Video Toaster package and entered the market as a low-cost way for TV production companies to create quality CGI for their programming. It first gained public attention with its use in the TV series Babylon 5 and is used in several contemporary TV series. Lightwave is also used in a variety of modern film productions. It is available for both Windows and OS X.
- LuxRender is an unbiased open source rendering engine featuring Metropolis light transport.

== M ==
- MacPerspective was a 3D perspective drawing program developed for the Macintosh computer in 1985.
- MakeHuman is a GPL program that generates 3D parametric humanoids.
- MASSIVE is a 3D animation system for generating crowd-related visual effects targeted for use in film and television. Originally developed for controlling the large-scale CGI battles in The Lord of the Rings, Massive has become an industry standard for digital crowd control in high-end animation and has been used on several other big-budget films. It is available for various Unix and Linux platforms as well as Windows.
- Maxwell Render is a multi-platform renderer that forgoes raytracing, global illumination and radiosity in favor of photon rendering with a virtual electromagnetic spectrum, resulting in very authentic-looking renders. It was the first unbiased render to market.
- Maya (Autodesk) is currently used in the film, television, and gaming industry. Maya has developed over the years into an application platform in and of itself through extendability via its MEL programming language. It is available for Windows, Linux and macOS.
- mental ray is another popular renderer, and comes default with most of the high-end packages. (Now owned by NVIDIA)
- MeshLab is a free Windows, Linux and macOS application for visualizing, simplifying, processing, and converting large three-dimensional meshes to or from a variety of 3D file formats.
- MetaCreations Detailer and Painter 3D are discontinued software applications specifically for painting texture maps on 3-D Models.
- MicroStation is proprietary 2D / 3D modelling program with extensive import/export capabilities by Bentley Systems.
- Modo (The Foundry) is a subdivision modeling, texturing, and rendering tool with support for camera motion and morphs (blend shapes). It is now used in the Television Industry and is available for Windows, macOS and Linux. (x86_64).
- Mudbox is a high-resolution brush-based 3D sculpting program, that claims to be the first of its type. The software was acquired by Autodesk in 2007 and has a current rival in its field known as ZBrush (see below).

== N ==
- NX (Siemens PLM Software) is an integrated suite of software for computer-aided mechanical design (mechanical CAM), computer-aided manufacturing (CAM), and computer-aided engineering (CAE) formed by combining the former Unigraphics and SDRC I-deas software product lines. NX is currently available for the following operating systems: Windows XP and Vista, Apple Mac OS X, and Novell SUSE Linux.

== O ==
- Octane Render is an unbiased GPU-accelerated renderer based on Nvidia CUDA.
- OpenFX is a modeling and animation studio, distributed under the GPL.

== P ==
- ParaView is an open source 3D scientific visualization platform.
- Poser (Bondware) Poser is a 3D rendering and animation computer program optimized for models that depict the human figure in three-dimensional form and is specialized for adjusting features of preexisting character models via varying parameters. It is also for posing and rendering models and characters. It includes some specialized tools for walk cycle creation, cloth and hair.
- POV-Ray (or The Persistence of Vision Raytracer) is a freeware (with source) ray tracer written for multiple platforms.
- PowerAnimator (Alias Systems Corporation) was a high-end 3D package in the 1990s, running on Silicon Graphics (SGI) workstations. Alias took code from PowerAnimator, TDI Explore, and Wavefront Technologies to build Maya.
- Presto is a proprietary software developed and used in-house by Pixar Animation Studios in the animation of their feature and short films. Presto is not available for sale and therefore is only used by Pixar.

== R ==
- Ray Dream Studio was a 3D modeling software application initially developed for the Macintosh in 1989. A less expensive, more limited version lacking animation capability was sold as Ray Dream Designer.
- RenderMan (Pixar) is a renderer, used in many studios. Animation packages such as 3DS Max and Maya can pipeline to RenderMan to do all the rendering.
- RealFlow simulates and renders particle systems of rigid bodies and fluids.
- Realsoft 3D Full-featured 3D modeling, animation, simulation, and rendering software available for Windows, Linux, Mac OS X, and Irix.
- Remo 3D is a commercial 3D modeling tool specialized in creating 3D models for real-time visualization, available for Windows and Linux.
- Rhinoceros 3D is a commercial modeling tool that has excellent support for freeform NURBS editing.

== S ==
- Sculpt 3D raytrace application released in 1987 for Amiga computers programmed by Eric Graham.
- Seamless3d is a NURBS based modelling and animation software with much of the focus on creating avatars optimized for real-time animation. It is free, open source under the MIT license.
- Showplace is a 3D computer graphics program which was released in the 1990s by Pixar with versions for Macintosh and Microsoft Windows.
- Silo (Nevercenter) is a subdivision-surface modeler available for OS X and Windows. Silo does not include a renderer. Silo is the bundled in modeler for the Electric Image Animation System suite.
- Simplygon is a commercial mesh processing package for remeshing general input meshes into real-time renderable meshes.
- SketchUp Free (Trimble) is a 3D modeling package that features a sketch-based modelling approach integrated with Google Earth and limits export to Google's "3D Warehouse", where users can share their content. It has a pro version which supports 2D and 3D model export functions among other features.
- SquidNet-NDP is a commercially available product for rendering 3D animations within a distributed network environment.
- Softimage (Autodesk) (formerly Softimage|XSI) is a 3D modeling and animation package that integrates with mental ray rendering. It is feature-similar to Maya and 3ds Max and is used in the production of professional films, commercials, video games, and other media.
- Solid Edge ( Siemens PLM Software) is a commercial application for design, drafting, analysis, and simulation of products, systems, machines and tools. All versions include feature-based parametric modeling, assembly modeling, drafting, sheet metal, weldment, freeform surface design, and data management. Application-programming interfaces enable scripting in Visual Basic and C programming.
- solidThinking (solidThinking) is a 3D solid/surface modeling and rendering suite which features a construction tree method of development. The tree is the "history" of the model construction process and allows real-time updates when modifications are made to points, curves, parameters or entire objects.
- SolidWorks (SolidWorks Corporation) is an application used for the design, detailing, and validation of products, systems, machines, and toolings. All versions include modeling, assemblies, drawing, sheetmetal, weldment, and freeform surfacing functionality. It also has support for scripting in Visual Basic and C.
- SolveSpace is a free libre and open source 2D and 3D CAD (computer-aided design) program. It is a constraint-based parametric modeler with simple mechanical simulation capabilities. Version 2.1 onward runs on Windows, Linux and macOS. It is developed by Jonathan Westhues and a community of volunteers.
- Spore (Maxis) is a game allowing users to design their own fully functioning creatures with a very rudimentary, easy-to-use interface. The game includes a COLLADA exporter, so models can be downloaded and imported into any other 3D software listed here that supports the COLLADA format. Models can also be directly imported into game development software such as Unity (game engine).
- Substance 3D (Adobe) is a suite of 3D model and texture authoring tools.
- Sunflow is an open source, photo-realistic renderer written in Java.
- Swift 3D (Electric Rain) is a relatively inexpensive 3D design, modeling, and animation application targeted to entry-level 3D users and Adobe Flash designers. Swift 3D supports vector and raster-based 3D animations for Adobe Flash and Microsoft Silverlight XAML.

== T ==
- Typestry (Pixar) is an abandonware 3D computer program released in the 1990s by Pixar for Macintosh and MS-DOS. It rendered and animated text in 3d in various fonts based on the user's input.
- Terragen and Terragen 2 are scenery generators.
- The Advanced Visualizer, a.k.a. TAV (Wavefront Technologies) was a high-end 3D package between the late 1980s and mid-1990s, running on Silicon Graphics (SGI) workstations. Wavefront first acquired TDI in 1993, before Wavefront itself was acquired in 1995 along with Alias by SGI to form Alias|Wavefront.
- trueSpace (Caligari Corporation) is a discontinued 3D program for Windows, although the company Caligari first found its start on the Amiga platform. trueSpace features modeling, animation, 3D-painting, and rendering capabilities. In 2009, Microsoft purchased TrueSpace and it is now available completely free of charge.

== V ==
- VRay is promoted for use in the architectural visualization field used in conjunction with 3ds Max and SketchUp. It is also commonly used with Maya and Rhino.
- Vue is a tool for creating, animating and rendering natural 3D environments. It was most recently used to create the background jungle environments in the 2nd and 3rd Pirates of the Caribbean films.

== W ==
- Wings 3D is a BSD-licensed, subdivision modeller.

== Z ==
- ZBrush (Pixologic) is a digital sculpting and animation tool that combines 3D/2.5D modeling, texturing and painting. It is available for OS X and Windows. It is used to create normal maps for low resolution models to make them look more detailed.

== See also ==
- Comparison of 3D computer graphics software
- Comparison of computer-aided design software
- Comparison of free software for audio
- List of 3D animation software
- List of 3D modeling software
- List of free and open-source software packages
- List of video editing software
