= List of 3D modeling software =

Render of Earth made with Blender

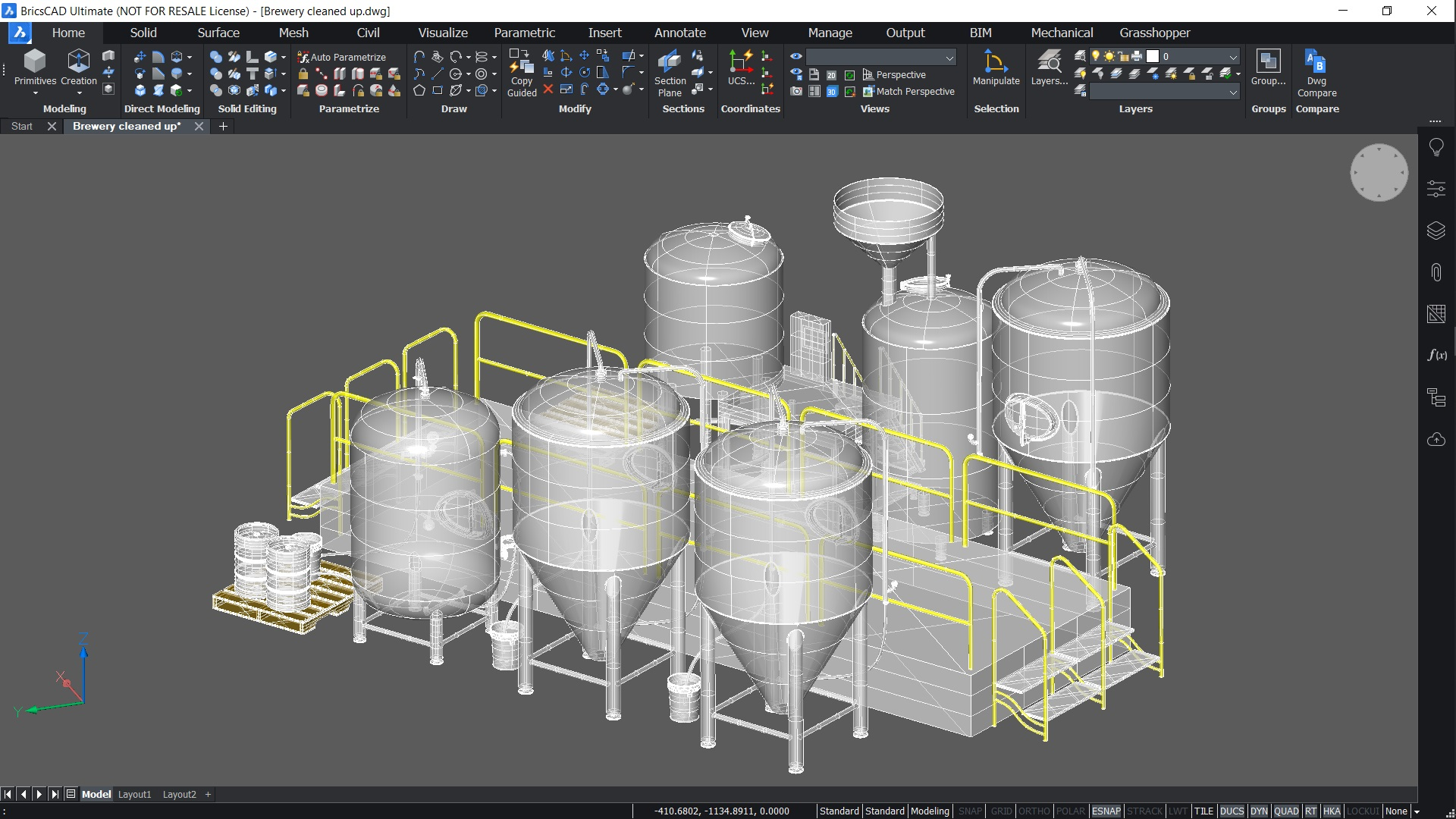
BricsCad workspace with model of a factory machine

Following is a list of notable software, computer programs, used to develop a mathematical representation of any three dimensional surface of objects, as 3D computer graphics, also called 3D modeling.

Title	License	3D rendering support	Actively developed
3Dj.app	freemium	Yes	{{Yes}
3D-Coat	Commercial software	Yes	Yes
3DCrafter	Commercial software	Yes	Yes
3D Slash	Freemium	Yes	No
3dvia Shape	Commercial software	No	Yes
AC3D	Commercial software	No	Yes
Adobe Dimension	Commercial software	Yes	Yes
Archimedes	EPL	Yes	No
Adobe Substance 3D Modeler	Commercial software	Yes	Yes
Alibre Design	Commercial software	Yes	Yes
Aladdin4D	Commercial software	Yes	No
Amapi	Commercial software	Yes	No
Anim8or	Freeware	Yes	No
Animation:Master	Commercial software	Yes	Yes
ArchiCAD	Commercial software	Yes	Yes
Art of Illusion	GNU General Public License +	Yes	Yes
AutoCAD	Commercial software	Yes	Yes
Autodesk 3ds Max	Commercial software	Yes	Yes
Autodesk Alias	Commercial software	Yes	Yes
Autodesk Inventor	Commercial software	Yes	Yes
Autodesk Maya	Commercial software	Yes	Yes
Autodesk Mudbox	Commercial software	Yes	Yes
Autodesk Revit	Commercial software	Yes	Yes
Autodesk Softimage	Commercial software	Yes	No
Autodesk Fusion	Commercial software	Yes	Yes
Blender	GNU GPLv2+	Yes	Yes
BrickLink Studio	Freeware	Yes	Yes
BricsCAD	Commercial software	Yes	Yes
BRL-CAD	GNU LGPL and BSD	Yes	Yes
Bryce	Commercial software	Yes	No
CATIA	Commercial software	Yes	Yes
Carrara	Commercial software	Yes	No
Cheetah3D	Commercial software	Yes	Yes
Cinema 4D	Commercial software	Yes	Yes
CityEngine	Commercial software	No	Yes
Clara.io	Freemium	Yes	No
Cobalt	Commercial software	Yes	Yes
Daz Studio	Freeware	Yes	Yes
DesignSpark Mechanical	Freemium	No	Yes
Electric Image Animation System	Commercial software	Yes	No
Exa Corporation	Commercial software	Yes	No
Flux	Freeware	No	No
FORAN System	Commercial software	Yes	No
Form-Z	Commercial software	Yes	Yes
FreeCAD	GNU LGPL	Yes	Yes
Geomodeller3D	Commercial software	Yes	Yes
Hexagon	Commercial software	No	No
Houdini	Commercial software	Yes	Yes
IRONCAD	Commercial software	Yes	Yes
KeyCreator	Commercial software	Yes	Yes
LightWave 3D	Commercial software	Yes	Yes
Lego Digital Designer	Freeware	No	No
LeoCAD	GPLv2	No	Yes
Makers Empire 3D	Freemium	Yes	No
MASSIVE	Commercial software	Yes	Yes
MeshLab	GNU GPL	Yes	Yes
Metasequoia	Commercial software	Yes	Yes
MicroStation	Commercial software	Yes	Yes
MikuMikuDance	Freeware	Yes	No
Modo	Commercial software	Yes	Yes
Onshape	Commercial software	Yes	Yes
Open CASCADE	GNU LGPL	Yes	Yes
OpenFX	GNU GPL	Yes	Yes
OpenSCAD	GNU GPL	Yes	Yes
Oculus Medium	Commercial software	Yes	Yes (as Adobe Medium)
Plasticity	Commercial software	No	Yes
Poser	Commercial software	Yes	Yes
PTC Creo	Commercial software	Yes	Yes
PowerAnimator	Commercial software	Yes	No
Pro/ENGINEER	Commercial software	Yes	Yes
QCAD	GPL-3.0-or-later	Yes	No
Quake Army Knife	GNU GPL	Yes	No
Realsoft 3D	Commercial software	Yes	No
Remo 3D	Commercial software	Yes	Yes
RFEM	Commercial software	Yes	Yes
Rhinoceros 3D	Commercial software	Yes	Yes
Salome	GNU LGPL	Yes	Yes
ScanIP	Commercial software	Yes	Yes
Seamless3d	MIT	No	No
NX	Commercial software	No	Yes
Shapr3D	Commercial software	Yes	Yes
SolidWorks Composer	Commercial software	Yes	Yes
SharkCAD	Commercial software	Yes	Yes
Silo	Commercial software	No	Yes
SketchUp	Freemium	Yes	Yes
Solid Edge	Commercial software	Yes	Yes
solidThinking	Commercial software	Yes	Yes (as Inspire)
SolidWorks	Commercial software	Yes	Yes
SolveSpace	GNU GPL	No	Yes
SpaceClaim	Commercial software	Yes	Yes
Strata 3D	Commercial software	Yes	Yes
Sweet Home 3D	GNU GPL	Yes	Yes
Swift 3D	Commercial software	No	No
Tekla Structures	Commercial software	Yes (basic level)	Yes
Tinkercad	Freeware	No	Yes
TopSolid	Commercial software	Yes	Yes
TrueSpace	Freeware	Yes	No
Vectorworks	Commercial software	Yes	Yes
Wings 3D	BSD	Yes	Yes
Wolfram Mathematica	Commercial software	Yes	Yes
ViaCAD	Commercial software	Yes	Yes (as PunchCAD)
ZBrush	Commercial software	Yes	Yes
Zmodeler	Commercial software	Yes	Yes

== See also ==
- Comparison of computer-aided design software
- List of 3D computer graphics software
- List of 3D animation software
- List of 3D rendering software
- List of 2D graphics software
- List of BIM software
- List of computer-aided manufacturing software
- CAD library – cloud based repository of 3D models or parts
- 3D scanning
