= Canoma =

Canoma was a 3D-modelling application for Windows and Macintosh which is now no longer supported by its company.

Released by MetaCreations Corp. in 1999, this application allowed users to create 3D models based on one or more photographs taken from various angles. This process is known as photogrammetry. The user "pinned" the corners of wireframe primitives over real world shapes such as buildings, boxes, cylinders and other geometric shapes (it could not really handle organic shapes), the application then dynamically extrapolated the perspective, angles and shapes and produced a 3D realization, applying the textures from the photograph(s) onto the models. Sides of the models unseen in the original photograph could be "mirrored" from the visible sides. The results could be animated and exported as a QuickTime movie or exported in the interactive browser-based MetaStream format (now known as Viewpoint). This remarkably easy to use application is now defunct, having been acquired by Adobe Systems in 2000 shortly after its inception. Parts of the technology were apparent in Adobe Atmosphere and now in Adobe Photoshop CS Extended.
