= Carrara (software) =

3D rendering software

- Developer: Daz 3D
- Stable release: 8.5.1.19 / August 26, 2013; 12 years ago
- Operating system: Windows Vista; Windows 7; Windows 8; Windows 10; Mac OS X Snow Leopard; Mac OS X Lion; OS X Mountain Lion
- Type: 3D computer graphics
- License: Proprietary commercial software
- Website: www.daz3d.com/carrara-8-5-pro

Carrara is a full-featured 3D computer graphics application featuring figure posing and editing, as well as nature modeling, in addition to traditional modeling, animation, texturing and rendering. The software is also capable of dynamic hair and fur simulations, particle effects, soft body and rigid body dynamics. Carrara is now owned and developed by Daz 3D. Carrara is compatible with Poser and Daz Studio formats of 3D figures and props. It is further supported by a number of 3rd party plug-ins and add-ons.

In addition to its native renderer, the program is also integrated with external 3rd party renderers LuxRender and Octane.

Carrara is considered to be comparatively easy to learn and use.

== History ==
The history of Carrara started in 1989 when a group of individuals founded Ray Dream, Inc., with the idea of creating graphic software for the new Macintosh computers with color displays. Two years later, the first version of their new 3D graphics program, which they named Ray Dream Studio, was released.

In the years that followed, Ray Dream Studio became a successful product having at one time over 200,000 users. In 1996, Ray Dream, Inc., was sold to Fractal Design Corporation (then the developer of Corel Painter and Poser). Fractal Design was in turn acquired by MetaTools (developer of Bryce and KPT) shortly thereafter. The combination of the two companies was given the new name MetaCreations. Around the same time, another 3D graphics program, named Infini-D, was acquired from Specular International. Now owning two 3D graphics programs, MetaCreations decided to merge Ray Dream and Infini-D into one application, giving it the new name Carrara.

MetaCreations released version 1.0 of Carrara with significant bugs. They soon released a patch for the code, then afterwards stopped support of the package. For a short period, the only way Carrara users could get the patch was through other internet sites or Carrara interest groups in different places on the web.

Around the year 2000, when MetaCreations was divesting itself of most of its products, it sold Carrara to a new company named Eovia, founded by former employee Antoine Clappier. Eovia developed Carrara for several versions, culminating with version 5 in 2005. That same year, Eovia shipped a new 3D modeling application, Hexagon.

Eovia made significant upgrades to Carrara, which included the Ray Dream physics engine, originally not licensed in the MetaCreations version of the code. Improvements included soft shadows, caustics, global illumination, and better atmosphere models.

In 2006, Daz 3D (developers of Daz Studio and a line of articulated 3D figures) acquired Eovia along with Carrara and Hexagon. Several former MetaCreations employees moved over to Daz and continued development on Carrara. Daz 3D added posable figures, models for hair, and animation tools. Daz 3D works in an "open development" environment, releasing early and turning to its users for bug reports and feature input.

In May 2010, the company released Carrara 8.0. It included the addition of the Bullet physics engine, with which Carrara can more realistically animate scenes involving collisions of multiple bodies or particles. Daz has also added models for soft-body dynamics, for better cloth and clothing animation.

== Features ==
=== Version 8.5 ===
- Native DSON importer
- Native auto-fit and improved fit-to-functionality for figures' clothing and accessories
- Improved sequencer, key-framing, and animation tools
- "Smart" content and CMS integration
- Animation commands — "Zero", "Memorise", "Restore" (for figures, selections, and selection trees)
- Improved representation of lights in viewport (spot, sun, moon, tube, and shape lights)
- Shader additions (Multi-Layer Shader and Elements)

=== Version 8.0 ===
- 64-bit support for macOS and Windows
- Multithreading for macOS and Windows
- Bullet physics library
- Improved FBX and COLLADA data exchange
- Negative lights and photometrics (IES)
- "God rays" and "barn door" lighting and effects
- Editing of posed meshes
- Puppeteer
