= Procedural modeling =

Class of techniques in computer graphics

Procedural modeling is an umbrella term for a number of techniques in computer graphics to create 3D models and textures from sets of rules that may be easily changed over time. L-Systems, fractals, and generative modeling are procedural modeling techniques since they apply algorithms for producing scenes. The set of rules may either be embedded into the algorithm, configurable by parameters, or the set of rules is separate from the evaluation engine. The output is called procedural content, which can be used in computer games, films, be uploaded to the internet, or the user may edit the content manually. Procedural models often exhibit database amplification, meaning that large scenes can be generated from a much smaller number of rules. If the employed algorithm produces the same output every time, the output need not be stored. Often, it suffices to start the algorithm with the same random seed to achieve this.

Although all modeling techniques on a computer require algorithms to manage and store data at some point, procedural modeling focuses on creating a model from a rule set, rather than editing the model manually by using user input, in order to make modifying model in the future easier. The parameters that define a model may be dependent on parameters or geometry from another model making modelling process very flexible. Procedural modeling is often applied when it would be too cumbersome to create a 3D model using generic 3D modelers, or when more specialized tools are required. This is often the case for plants, architecture or landscapes.

== Procedural modeling suites ==
This is a list of Wikipedia articles about specific procedural modeling software products.

- 3ds Max
- Blender
- BRL-CAD
- Bryce
- Modo
- Cinema 4D
- CityEngine
- Generative Modelling Language
- Grasshopper 3D
- Grome
- Houdini
- HyperFun
- MojoWorld
- OpenSCAD
- Softimage
- SpeedTree
- Terragen
- VUE
- Xfrog

== See also ==
- Parametric models in statistics
- Parametric design in Computer-Aided Design
- Procedural generation in video games
