= Mojoworld =

Mojoworld may refer to:

- MojoWorld Generator, a fractal landscape generator
- Mojoworld or Mojo World, home planet of the Marvel Comics supervillain Mojo
