= FORAN System =

CAD/CAM/CAE system

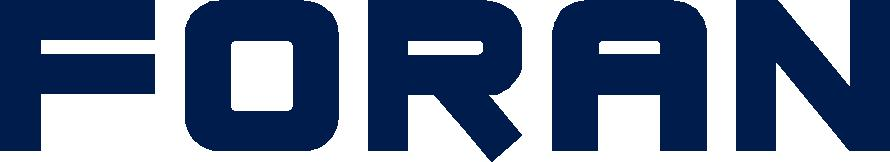
FORAN system logo

The FORAN system is an integrated CAD/CAM/CAE system developed by SENER for the design and production of practically any naval ship and offshore unit. It is a multidisciplinary and integrated system that can be used in all the ship design and production phases and disciplines. The system collects all the information in a single database. FORAN is mainly focused on the design of:

- Merchants, roll-on/roll-off, bulk carriers, chemical tankers, container ships and cement and oil tankers.
- Navy vessels (surface ships and submarines), in which the systems allows designers to carry out configuration control, analyze different design alternatives (prototypes), handle advanced hull forms and manage materials and special standards, as well as introducing customized criteria.
- Specific vessels, tugs and workboats, hotel vessels, fishing vessels, fish transport vessels, oceanographic vessels, etc.
- For use in the offshore industry such as floating platforms (both anchored and fixed), staff transportation services, anchor vessels and vessels for applications such as supply, rescue, firefighting or anti-pollution.

As on 2023, FORAN is a part of Siemens PLM Software.

== FORAN V70 ==
Common tools: this version supports Unicode characters; this functionality enables entering text and generating information in languages using non Latin characters such as Chinese, Russian or Korean. FORAN dialogues and menu names can also be translated. Moreover, this update includes FVIEWER, a virtual reality module that replace the former VISUAL3D module. This application takes advantage of state-of-the-art graphic cards capabilities and allows the management of huge amount of information data.

Drafting: This update includes also a new 2D environment, based in the QCAD application and compatible with AutoCAD, developed to be used in the modules for the norms and structure standards definition (FNORM), and in the General Arrangement module (FGA) and for the definition of electrical and P&I diagrams. It also includes developments for the interim products drawings, symbolic drawings and the 3D model views drawings.

Project: One of the most relevant developments of the new version is the General Arrangement module (FGA) for spaces and general ship arrangement definition, both in 2D or 3D environments, with all data stored in the FORAN database. The application allows generating the general arrangement drawing in an efficient way. On the other hand, the module for the probabilistic damage stability calculations (FSUBD) offers now the possibility to consider intermediate stages of flooding, according to SOLAS standard. The automatic assignment of spaces to subzones has also been improved.

Hull structure: A FNORM module for the definition of standards of structure is provided with a user interface, including multi dock windows and snap points; furthermore, it allows adding geometrical restrictions and includes the possibility of layer management. The increase of the lengths of the identifications and descriptions of blocks, materials and geometrical norms, as well as the hierarchical structure for the definition of the standards and geometrical norms are other capabilities of this module. Moreover, following features must be highlighted: hull structure modeling: an algorithm to represent corrugated parts more accurately, commands for checking the edge preparation of plates and profiles, options for the definition of face bars and an algorithm to represent more accurately curved shell and deck plates. Regarding profiles and plates nesting, the NEST module allows the nesting of identical parts assigned to different interim products and keeps information to recognize each individual part.

Outfitting: FORAN V70 includes piping design tools for pipeline routing. Some important characteristics featured in the new update regard the polygonal lines, which are no more needed, the pipelines that are now routed dynamically displaying the pipeline as a solid model with significant snap points of the model. The version incorporates design functionalities adapted to the production circumstances in each shipyard, such as a command for smart splitting of pipe segments based on the standard pipe length defined in the components library, or checking utilities to control the spool fabrication restrictions before generating drawings and greater flexibility for the creation of sets of piping elements.

Electrical design: The electrical design module allows now to generate cable conduits for special non-standard cross-section cableways and to define conduits with cables inside cable trays, considering them in the cross-section filling calculations. In the cable routing the definition of cable splitting has also been improved and the management of cables partially routed has a better functionality in the connection between cables and terminal blocks.

Product lifecycle management (PLM): FORAN V70 allows the integration with different PLM Systems, thanks to a neutral solution built with standards based on CORBA and web services.

== FVIEWER ==
The use of a virtual reality (VR) environment offers significant advantages in shipbuilding. The most important advantage is the possibility to review the model and to find out errors at early design stages, with an important cost reduction. VR allows an intuitive and quick evaluation of the model, queries, measurement of distances, ergonomic studies, collision detection, design changes evaluation, simulation of mounting, dismantling and operation tasks, etc. The viewer, called FVIEWER, which is part of the FORAN system, includes stereoscopic capability as feature, which means that it allows the 3D navigation around the model of a ship, being possible to use it with tracking devices. The module can be used during a 3D navigation with a great user-model interaction. The solution can be used in any kind of VR room as well as in portable solutions, workstations, etc.

== Head-mounted display (HMD) ==
The development of applications in a Virtual Reality environment within the shipbuilding industry is booming nowadays. After the development of the second generation of the viewer for interactive navigation through the ship 3D model, SENER and Ingevideo have developed a head-mounted display (HMD). A virtual reality HMD is a device that lets the user view and interact with 3D simulation environments, in this case applied to 3D models generated in FORAN. The possibility of working in virtual reality environments provides benefits and cost reductions, since it allows virtual screening in an interactive and intuitive way.

== Uses ==
The FORAN system is used in more than 150 ship design offices and shipyards in 30 countries. Some of its most significant uses are:

- Strategic projection ship for Navantia.
- Cruise salvage vessel for the China Ship Development and Design Center (CSDDC).
- CVF, aircraft carrier for the Royal Navy (client: BAE Systems Babcock Marine).
- “Bahía Uno”, oil tanker for Astilleros de Murueta.
- “Ruiloba”, container ship for 1,350 TEU for the client Hijos de J. Barreras Shipyard.
- Frigate F-310 built at the Navantia shipyards for the Norwegian Royal Navy.
- Semi-submersible platform GM 400 for Global Maritime.

== See also ==
- Comparison of computer-aided design editors
- List of 3D computer graphics software
- List of 3D rendering software
- List of 3D modeling software
