= Kai Krause =

German computer scientist

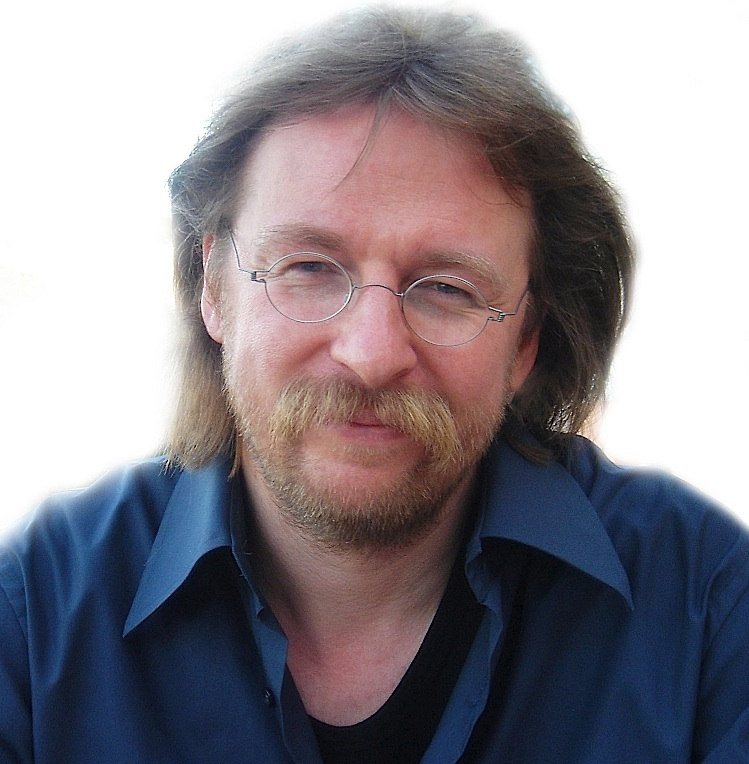
- Kai Krause in 2009
- Born: 14 March 1957 (age 69); Dortmund, Germany
- Website: kai.sub.blue

Kai Krause (born 14 March 1957) is a German software and graphical user interface designer, best known for founding MetaCreations Corp., for his Kai's Power Tools series of products, and for his contributions to graphical user interface design.

== Biography ==
Born in Dortmund, Germany, Krause moved to California, United States in 1976. He worked with early synthesizers and vocoders, and contributed sound effects to almost thirty records and movies. During the 1990s he ran a software company to develop tools for graphic designers.

In February 2005, the "DEMO" conference acknowledged him as one of the Top 15 Innovators of the last 15 years. Krause has a Master's degree from the Brooks Institute in Santa Barbara, California (1996), and an honorary doctorate from the University of Essen, Germany (1999). Today Krause lives and works in the 1000-year-old Rheineck Castle near Bonn in Germany.

== History ==
The company which he co-founded, MetaCreations Corp., began as HSC Software, which released the first version of Kai's Power Tools in 1992. HSC released a second version, and the first version of Bryce, and several other titles before changing their name to MetaTools in 1995. This name remained until 1997, when a rapid series of mergers with Fractal Design, RayDream, Specular, and RTG (Real-Time Geometry) necessitated a new identity for the growing organization: MetaCreations.

The interfaces of Krause's products used soft shadows, rounded corners, and translucency prior to their wider adoption.

For the rest of the 1990s, MetaCreations continued to develop a variety of successful graphical software titles. Application and interfaces for which Krause was most directly responsible include Kai's Power Tools, Live Picture, Bryce, Kai's Power Show, Kai's Power Goo, Convolver, Kai's Photo Soap and Poser.

== Software ==
- Kai's Power Tools is now published by Corel Corporation, as "The Corel KPT Collection".
- KPT Bryce is now published by Daz 3D, as simply "Bryce".
- Kai's Power Show, Kai's Photo Soap and Kai's Power Goo are now property of Nuance Communications. They have been discontinued.
- Frax, a fractal explorer for iOS
