= Amapi =

3D modelling software

- Original authors: Yonowat S. A., Laurent Billy and Jean-Marc Noirot-Cosson
- Developer: Smith Micro
- Initial release: 1993; 32 years ago
- Final release: v 7.5 / August 18, 2006; 19 years ago
- Written in: C++
- Type: 3D computer graphics
- License: Proprietary commercial software

Amapi was a 3D modeler created by Yonowat S.A. that incorporates both polygonal modeling and NURBS surface modeling. Amapi was used to create models for industrial design, architecture, interior design, furniture, exhibit design, packaging, bottling, illustration, video games and multimedia. The name of both the company and the software originate from a common saying by the cartoon character Droopy: "You know what? I'm happy.".

Amapi offered an original interface compared to other contemporary modeling software. The software divided modeling into three main activities: construction, modeling, and assembly. Switching between these three activities was accomplished by swiping the cursor against the right hand side of the screen, an example of a gestural user interface.

== History ==
Originally developed by Yonowat S.A. in 1993, Amapi was sold to Template Graphics Software in 1997. TGS developed and sold the software under its Eovia brand. In 2006, Eovia sold the Carrara and Amapi based Hexagon software products to Daz 3D, while Amapi was sold to e frontier. In 2007, e frontier closed its French offices and dissolved the Amapi team. In 2008, e frontier sold the Amapi asset to Smith Micro. Smith Micro sold version 7.5 of Amapi Pro for a few years on its web site, but apparently did not continue to develop the software. The software is no longer listed for sale by Smith Micro.

== Version History ==
Version	Platform	Release date	Notes
1.0	Macintosh, Windows	1993	Initial Release
4.0	PowerPC Macintosh, Windows	July 8, 1998	3D Text, Texturing
4.1	PowerPC Macintosh, Windows	December 2, 1998	
4.1.5	PowerPC Macintosh, Windows	February 17, 1999	Intel SIMD CPU support
4.15	PowerPC Macintosh, Windows	May 11, 1999	Gordon Surfaces
5.0	PowerPC Macintosh, Windows	January 5, 2000	Dynamic Geometry
6.0	PowerPC Macintosh, Windows	June 9, 2001	
7.0	PowerPC Macintosh, Windows	July 29, 2003	
7.5.1	PowerPC Macintosh, Windows	March 14, 2006	
