= Adobe Atmosphere =

3D computer graphics software platform

- Other names: V3O, 3D Anarchy
- Developer: Adobe Systems
- Release: March 26, 2001
- Final release: Builder 1.0.0.198 (October 31, 2003; 23 years ago) [±] Player 1.0.0.216 (February 10, 2004; 22 years ago) [±]
- Operating system: Microsoft Windows
- Available in: English
- Type: 3D computer graphics
- License: Proprietary
- Website: adobe.com/products/atmosphere

Adobe Atmosphere Community Server
- Developer: Adobe Systems
- Final release: 1.0 / January 2, 2002; 24 years ago
- Operating system: Linux
- Type: Web server
- License: Open source

Adobe Atmosphere was a software platform for interacting with 3D computer graphics. 3D models created with the commercial program could be explored socially using a browser plugin available free of charge. Atmosphere was originally developed by Attitude Software as 3D Anarchy and was later bought by Adobe Systems. The product spent the majority of its lifetime in beta testing. Adobe released the last version of Atmosphere, version 1.0 build 216, in February 2004, then discontinued the software in December that year.

== Features ==
In Adobe's Atmosphere Museum of Art, each gallery was connected via a system of colorful "portals."

Atmosphere focused on explorable "worlds" (later officially called "environments"), which were linked together by "portals", analogous to the World Wide Web's hyperlinks. These portals were represented as spinning squares of red, green, and blue that revolved around each other and floated above the ground. Portals were indicative of the Atmosphere team's desire to mirror the functionality of Web pages. Although the world itself was described in the .aer (or .atmo) file, images and sounds were kept separately, usually in the GIF, WAV or MP3 format. Objects in worlds were scriptable using a specialized dialect of JavaScript, allowing a more immersive environment, and worlds could be generated dynamically using PHP. Using JavaScript, a world author could link an object to a Web page, so that a user could, for example, launch a Web page by clicking on a billboard advertisement (Ctrl+Shift+Click in earlier versions). By version 1.0, Atmosphere also boasted support for using Macromedia Flash animations and Windows Media Video as textures.

Atmosphere-based worlds consisted mainly of parametric primitives, such as floors, walls, and cones. These primitives could be painted a solid color, given an image-based texture, or made "subtractive". Invisible, "subtractive" primitives could be used to cut "holes" in other primitives, to build more complex shapes. Many worlds also contained animated polygon meshes made possible by Atmosphere's implementation as a subcomponent of Viewpoint Corporation's Viewpoint Media Player. However, Viewpoint stopped supporting the Atmosphere subcomponent some time before Atmosphere was discontinued.

Unlike the more centralized structure of Active Worlds, in which environments are primarily built within AlphaWorld, Atmosphere worlds were spread throughout the Internet, usually hosted on the author's own Web site as .aer files. There were binary and ASCII versions of the .aer file format, though the ASCII format was phased out in later releases. .aer files could be generated dynamically using server-side content management systems, as demonstrated by the AtmoWorlds.com Worlds Directory.

Users were represented in worlds by avatars. In later builds, an option allowed the user to see his or her own avatar. An early quirk of Atmosphere displayed users whose avatars had not yet loaded as colorful, slanted cylinders, and announced the arrival of users with a "bug zapper" sound.

Whereas in ActiveWorlds it is only possible to communicate with users within a 200-meter radius, Atmosphere users could chat with all the users in the world. This model was more appropriate for Atmosphere, considering the smaller sizes of most worlds. Technically, users could chat with anyone in the same YACP channel, a reference to the IRC protocol (see below). The exception was when worlds would receive too many visitors, as was often the case at HomeWorld: worlds would "clone", creating duplicate channels for the same world, which would often cause confusion for users. Some world developers wrote scripts that limited communication to users within a certain distance, for greater realism.

With three-dimensional wireframe views and multiple floating tool windows, the Atmosphere Builder was reminiscent of both CAD software and professional graphics applications like Adobe Photoshop.

A built-in Havok physics engine, detailed rendering, and dynamic lighting (with support for lighting effects like radiosity, distance fog, and glare) also contributed to the realism of Atmosphere worlds. Many world authors wanted to create large worlds, in order to build more realistic cities, for example, but such worlds would often take an excessive amount of time to load in the visitor's web browser, especially if the visitor was using a slower dial-up connection. To alleviate this issue, Atmosphere supported a pattern reminiscent of inline frames in HTML: sections of the world – subworlds or models – would load as the user neared, so that a city could load block by block, rather than all at once. One of Atmosphere's problems, however, was excessive memory usage, which was exacerbated by the use of advanced features such as embedded models and Flash movies in many worlds.

Atmosphere's chat console used the Windows-1252 character encoding.

From its inception, Adobe Photoshop Album included a "3D gallery" feature that could publish a photo album as an Atmosphere world.

== History ==
Adobe Atmosphere began as 3D Anarchy by Attitude Software. It originally relied on IRC for chat functionality. The original user interface was rather eccentric, featuring two ever-present eyeballs that would occasionally blink. Later versions adopted a more conventional interface, although one of the pre-supplied avatars was based on the eyes. Adobe bought the technology from Attitude in November 1999 and announced the first public beta version under the new name on March 26, 2001.

Atmosphere came as two stand-alone applications: the Builder, which was used to build online "worlds", and the Player, which allowed users to explore these worlds. (In 3D Anarchy, these components were called Editor and Chat, respectively.) In addition to these applications, Adobe provided a browser plugin, to explore these worlds within a web browser, and a companion chat server called Adobe Community Server, which ran on an IRC-like protocol known as Yet Another Chat Protocol (YACP). During beta-testing, all three components of Atmosphere were available free of charge. Adobe distributed the server software under an open source license.

In later releases, the Atmosphere Player ran as a plugin within Internet Explorer.

Beta versions of the Builder were notoriously unstable, and the program crashed so frequently that a user wrote a program that automatically saved worlds opened in the Builder at a fixed interval, preventing users from losing hours of work.

In August 2002, Adobe began to scrap the stand-alone Player, instead devoting more resources to develop the Atmosphere Plugin, which was at the time viewed as a buggy, less attractive alternative to the Player. The company's focus on the Plugin was viewed as an attempt to compete with Flash before its developer, Macromedia, was purchased by Adobe. For the most part, the Plugin ran only on Internet Explorer for Windows, despite frequent requests by community members to expand Atmosphere support to Mozilla-based browsers, and to Linux and Mac OS. Unofficially, the plugin ran in Mozilla-based browsers with limited functionality. One user was able to run the stand-alone Player on Linux using Wine, albeit in a less-than-usable state.

As part of its efforts to garner commercial interest in the software, Adobe introduced support for embedding Atmosphere worlds into PDF documents for viewing in Acrobat Reader. The company also distanced Atmosphere from its reputation as a platform for online chat, by first disabling chat on the various official, Adobe-hosted worlds, then by deleting the worlds themselves.

Version 1.0 was released on October 22, 2003. At this point, Adobe decided to charge for the Builder, which was simply renamed Atmosphere, and continue to provide the Plugin and Server for free. As the beta-testing program ended, Adobe sent free copies of the Builder to registered beta-testers in late 2003 and early 2004 via Airborne Express and DHL. Following a long period of relative silence from the developers, Adobe announced in December 2004 that it would not continue development of the software. According to an FAQ from Adobe:

The decision to discontinue Atmosphere 1.0 was based on market conditions, customer feedback and research done by Adobe.

— Adobe Systems

Adobe retains copyright on Atmosphere and does not give permission for others to distribute copies of the software, so the company's decision to stop making the Builder available for purchase has essentially halted the creation of new worlds. The plugin remains available as a free download on Adobe's FTP site, however. Adobe still provides 3D capabilities in its more popular Adobe Acrobat product, but these features were developed using technology from New Zealand's Right Hemisphere, rather than using Atmosphere. Nearly all of the Atmosphere development team went on to work with the Acrobat team. The only Atmosphere component still in use at Adobe is the scripting API; other Atmosphere components including scene graphs and the physics engine were licensed from other companies, such as Viewpoint.

== Community ==
Atmosphere had a dedicated beta-testing community, whose members constructed many worlds and avatars, promoted the software by word of mouth, and conducted community events, such as world tours and building contests. The largest of these contests was Star Wars 3D, a large-scale effort to create a comprehensive set of worlds and avatars based on the Star Wars trilogy. The creations were unveiled on July 4, 2003, and festivities officially continued until July 6. Another large effort held was themed to the Lord of the Rings trilogy.

Community members also organized and attended events such as World Tours, which featured innovative worlds each week, and Tech Talks, originally a weekly event intended for world and avatar developers. Initially, most community discussion occurred either in the worlds or at the appropriate Adobe User-to-User Forums. Later, to supplement the official Atmosphere product Web site and discussion forums, the community created a large number of resource Web sites, some of which are listed below.

Beta-testers dubbed the Atmosphere developers "zombies", in recognition of the long hours the Adobe employees apparently spent developing the software. The running joke on the team was that, instead of the typical meal of brains, Atmosphere's zombies ingested eyeballs, due to the visual nature of the product. The beta-testing community eagerly awaited new releases from the development team, to which the developers invariably answered that it would take "about two weeks"; this response became a euphemism for "when it's ready."

Despite the decentralized structure of Atmosphere and the popularity of the world-building contests, the Atmosphere community still preferred to gather in worlds created by Adobe and its partner DigitalSpace, such as Adobe's annually-revamped HomeWorld and DigitalSpace's Atmospherians Community. As the HomeWorld was the primary starting place for new users, the community found it easier to establish lively crowds there. When Adobe shut down HomeWorld, along with a number of other Adobe-hosted worlds, many builders made attempts at emulating the success of HomeWorld with their own starting points. However, without the constant stream of new users that HomeWorld experienced, most of these attempts failed to attract more than a small group of regulars.

Years after Adobe ended support for Atmosphere, some worlds remain online, though very few have been maintained and fewer still continue to support multi-user chat. Nonetheless, the software continues to enjoy a small fanbase that meets online each year on Halloween.

== See also ==
- Active Worlds
- Microsoft V-Chat
- Second Life
- VRML
- X3D
