= Sinespace =

2016 video game

- Developer: Sine Wave Entertainment
- Release: November 2016
- Written in: Unity 3D
- Engine: Unity
- Platform: Microsoft Windows, Mac OS, Linux, WebGL, iOS, Android, Oculus, Vive, Windows Mixed Reality
- Type: Virtual Reality

Sinespace is a free-to-play massively multiplayer online Unity 3D-based platform created and published by Sine Wave Entertainment. It enables users to create and sell 3D content and interact with others as 3D avatars. It was beta launched in November 2016 and teamed up with Unity to make its SDK available in the Unity Asset Store in March 2019. It supports Oculus Rift, HTC Vive and Windows Mixed Reality headsets, but is also accessible through PC, Mac, Linux, and Chrome web browsers.

== Usage ==
Sinespace's usage is similar to that of multiplayer virtual worlds. Players can create and customize their own 3D worlds and 3D content such as vehicles, mini-games, avatar clothing and gestures, and sell them for real world money. Players can also customize the shape and appearance of their avatar and buy avatars from third-party developers such as Daz 3D. Content is created through a Unity 3D-compatible SDK, and in-game through building tools.

== Enterprise ==
Sinespace also has private, white-labeled grids for enterprise use. Customers include the U.S. Department of Defense, Pearson Education, Virgin Group, the Smithsonian, the University of Edinburgh, Michigan State University, and other organizations.

== Events ==
Sinespace has hosted several in-world talk shows featuring live audiences of avatars with notable people in the arts and technology, who also appear in avatar form, including video game designer Warren Spector, VR pioneer Jaron Lanier, MMO pioneer Richard Bartle, and Hugh Welchman, producer of the Oscar-nominated animated feature Loving Vincent.

== Developer ==
Sinespace's lead developer is Adam Frisby, who was also a key developer of the open source virtual world OpenSimulator. Frisby additionally created a company that earned seven figures in real money by selling content in Second Life. Sinespace is published by Sine Wave Entertainment, a company based in London. The chairman is Peter Norris, who is also Chairman of Virgin Group.
