= Spectral rendering =

Computer graphics rendering technique

In computer graphics, spectral rendering is a technique in which a scene's light transport is modeled with real wavelengths. This process is typically slower than traditional rendering, which renders the scene in its red, green, and blue components and then overlays the images. Spectral rendering is often used in ray tracing or photon mapping to more accurately simulate the scene, often for comparison with an actual photograph to test the rendering algorithm (as in a Cornell Box) or to simulate different portions of the electromagnetic spectrum for the purpose of scientific work. The images simulated are not necessarily more realistic appearing, but when compared to a real image pixel for pixel the result is often much closer.

Spectral rendering can also simulate light sources and objects more effectively, as the light's emission spectrum can be used to release photons at a particular wavelength in proportion to the spectrum. Objects' spectral reflectance curves can similarly be used to reflect certain portions of the spectrum more accurately.

As an example, certain properties of tomatoes make them appear differently under sunlight than under fluorescent light. Using the blackbody radiation equations to simulate sunlight or the emission spectrum of a fluorescent bulb in combination with the tomato's spectral reflectance curve, more accurate images of each scenario can be produced.

== Implementations ==
Render engines that define themselves as being capable of spectral rendering:

- Vred
- Arion
- FluidRay
- Indigo Renderer
- LuxCoreRender
- mental ray
- Mitsuba
- Octane Render
- Spectral Studio
- Thea Render
- Ocean
- ART
- Manuka
- Predict Engine
- Malia
