= Adobe Dimension =

3D design software

- Adobe Dimension CC on macOS
- Developer: Adobe Systems
- Release: October 18, 2017; 8 years ago
- Stable release: 4.1.8 / March 5, 2026; 6 months ago
- Written in: C++
- Operating system: Windows and macOS
- Available in: 26 languages
- List of languages English (United States), English (United Kingdom), Arabic, Chinese Simplified, Chinese Traditional, Czech, Danish, Dutch, Finnish, French, German, Hebrew, Hungarian, Italian, Japanese, Korean, Norwegian, Polish, Portuguese, Russian, Spanish, Swedish, Romanian, Turkish and Ukrainian
- Type: Raster graphics editor
- License: Trialware, SaaS
- Website: www.adobe.com/products/dimension.html

Adobe Dimension is a 3D rendering and design software developed and published by Adobe Systems for macOS and Windows operating systems. It was founded as Project Felix on March 28, 2017, and became Dimension on October 18, 2017.

== Overview ==
Unlike with other modeling programs such as SketchUp, models are not created in Dimension. Instead, Dimension is a photo-based mockup editor where models, photos and textures need to be created in third-party software before being imported into Dimension. Once in Dimension, models and images can be composed into arrangements before being rendered to photorealistic 2D images.

== History ==
Originally relying on the V-Ray rendering engine, Adobe switched to its own 3D rendering engine called Adobe Rendering Engine (ARE) with the release of Dimension CC2.2 in April 2019, and stated that support for external rendering engines may be considered in the future.

On June 23, 2021, Adobe released Adobe Substance 3D Stager, which is part of the Adobe Substance 3D Collection and not included with the Creative Cloud All Apps subscription. Adobe Dimension is still available and included in the Creative Cloud All Apps plan. Adobe has committed to providing support for the original Dimension program.

=== Dimensions ===
Historically, Adobe released a similar program called Adobe Dimensions from 1992 to 1997, intended as an easy way to turn vector artwork from Illustrator into simple 3D renders, similarly to Specular LogoMotion or Alias Sketch!. It was discontinued in 2004, with some of its features then merged into Illustrator CS as Live Effects.
