= Typestry =

Pixar Typestry
- Typestry 2.1.1 use System 6.
- Original author(s): Pixar
- Developer(s): Pixar
- Initial release: 1990; 35 years ago
- Final release: 2.1.1 / 1995.12.22; 29 years ago
- Operating system: MacOS System 6, System 7, Windows
- Type: 3D graphics
- License: Pixar EULA
- Website: www.pixar.com

Typestry is a 3D software program released in the 1990s by Pixar for Apple Macintosh and Windows-based PC computer systems. Unlike general purpose modellers and renderers, Typestry concentrated on rendering and animating text entered by the user in multiple fonts. The fonts were extruded into three dimensions, with various bevel styles and textures applied during rendering. Typestry creates 3D text with Type 1 and TrueType fonts and can do many different effects:

- four different bevel styles
- add Looks
- 9 front and 9 back lights (with intensity, relative positions, and style settings)
- one ambient front and one ambient back light
- object scaling, movement, and rotation
- Text and light animation
- TIFF, EPS, PICT, RIB file formats

Version 2.0

- Compatibility with EPS files from Adobe Illustrator 3.0+
- Particle system
- Rubber sheets for flag effect
- Tubes for outline text
- Fog effect
- RenderMan Expert mode to edit Looks
- Required Adobe Type Manager 2.0+ for Type 1 fonts
- Required Windows 3.11+ with Win 32s or Windows NT with 8MB RAM and 7MB hard drive space for Wintel.

Version 2.1

- TrueType GX font support (Mac System 7 only)
- Import/export 3D Portable Digital Documents
- Native for PowerMac

Mac users could not use outline fonts if the screen font was not installed. Type 1 fonts were more accessible, since they have a screen font for each style (italic, bold, heavy, etc.), but TrueType fonts only have one screen font as the main style. Windows users could use any Windows font.

Typestry was one of Pixar's several application software packages released in open markets (others included RenderMan, MacRenderMan, NetRenderMan, IceMan, Glimpse, Showplace, and One Twenty Eight). It was discontinued when Pixar chose to concentrate on film production instead of application development.

== Glimpse ==
Glimpse was a tool for creating photo-realistic 3D objects and environments by applying shaders in an attempt to make RenderMan standard. Pixar also sold Glimpse for use with Typestry and ShowPlace. Later, ShowPlace 2.0 included Glimpse. Glimpse had sliders to change material attributes like color, reflection coefficients, and surface roughness, and gave users a real-time preview of changes without needing RenderMan to render. Glimpse did not let users edit shader source code. Looks had two views: Look Masters, the default setting for Look without editing options) and Looks Instances, which was created by changing settings in Glimpse.

Valis Group provided an alternative, Shader Toolkit, but was more complex than Glimpse.
