= Infini-D =

Discontinued computer graphics program

Infini-D is a discontinued 3D computer graphics program developed by Specular International. It was continued up to version 4.5 by MetaCreations when Specular merged with it. It combined with Ray Dream Studio to create Carrara. Soon after, Metacreations divested itself of all products other than MetaStream, including selling Carrara to Eovia. It was sold to the current developer, DAZ, upon Eovia's breaking up.

Infini-D is a diverse package, useful for creating print, web, and video media. It spawned LogoMotion, a basic 3D application like Adobe Dimensions aimed at print and multimedia users. It has a friendly interface, and the ability to queue and distribute render jobs to a render farm, freeing the artist's computer for other tasks. Distributed Rendering was initially handled through a separate program, BackBurner, but it was incorporated into Infini-D 4. Infini-D was especially popular in the Macintosh market.

== Awards ==
- Macworld 1996 World Class Award, “Best 3D Modeler/Renderer”
- New Media 1996 Hyper Award, “Best 3D Software Under $1000”
- Presentations Magazine 1996 Presenter's Choice Award, “Best Animation Software”
- MacUser 1995 Editor's Choice Award, “Best New 3D Application”
- Macworld 1994 World Class Award, “Best 3D Product”
- Macworld 1994 Editor's Choice Award

== External links/Sources ==
- Specular Infini-D 3.5 product description on the Wayback Machine (1997)
