= Ken Musgrave =

American computer scientist (1955-2018)

Forest Kenton Musgrave (16 September 1955 – 14 December 2018) was a professor at The George Washington University in the USA. A computer artist who worked with fractal images, he worked on the Bryce landscape software and later as CEO/CTO of Pandromeda, Inc. developed and designed the MojoWorld software.

== Education ==
He obtained his Ph.D in Computer science from Yale University in 1993, writing his thesis on Methods for Realistic Landscape Imaging. He was referred to by Benoît Mandelbrot as being "the first true fractal-based artist".

== Software work ==
Musgrave designed the initial fractal-based programs on which Bryce was based, and later worked on designing the Deep Materials Lab component of Bryce.

His work was featured in an article in the January 1996 Scientific American (Gibbs, "Playing Slartibartfast with Fractals") which discussed fractal curves. The article also described software he had designed which would generate entire Earth-size planets using semi-random procedural 3D, and then allow a user to fly or walk about that world, exploring mountains or forests, and choosing a scene to render to an image. The software eventually became a commercial release called MojoWorld, which went through three releases to end with version 3.1.1.

== Cinema work ==
Musgrave received screen credits for digital effects in the films Titanic, Dante's Peak and Lawnmower Man. His MojoWorld software was used to procedurally generate background mattes and terrains on movies such as The Day After Tomorrow.

== ZeniMax Media ==
Musgrave was technical advisor at ZeniMax Media parent company of videogame publisher Bethesda Softworks, at the time of releases such as the RPG Morrowind.

== Publications ==
- Texturing and Modeling: A Procedural Approach - F. Kenton Musgrave et al., 1998 - ISBN 0-12-228730-4
- Musgrave, F. Kenton (1993). "Methods for Realistic Landscape Imaging" (PDF).

== See also ==
- Fractal landscape
