= Ray Dream Studio =

- Developers: Ray Dream, Inc. MetaCreations
- Final release: 5.5.1 / September 1999
- Operating system: Classic Mac OS, Windows
- Type: 3D computer graphics
- License: Proprietary

Ray Dream Studio was a low-end 3D modeling software application. Initially developed by Ray Dream, Inc. in 1989-1991 for the Macintosh, it was acquired and upgraded over the course of mergers with Fractal Design and MetaCreations. Ray Dream was less expensive than most other offerings, renowned for its ease of use, and boasted an impressive feature set including a sophisticated shader editor. Other software programs from the same developers, such as Fractal Design Painter 3D, were often introduced in basic form to the suite. A moderately limited version lacking animation capability was sold for $99 as Ray Dream Designer (later Ray Dream 3D), and quickly became a mass-market favorite.

A third party developer's eco-system created a variety of plugins for the product.

The first release shipped in 1991 and was followed by version 2 in 1993 and version 3 in January 1994. Version 4, released in 1995 was the first release available on Windows as well. Corel Corp licensed the software and marketed a version under the Corel Dream name starting in 1995. In 1996, Ray Dream was acquired by Fractal Design, and in early 1997, Fractal Design merged with MetaTools to form MetaCreations. Versions 5.0 and 5.5 were released by MetaCreations. The software was then merged with its higher-end stepsister, Infini-D, to form Carrara, lending many user interface elements and gaining a better rendering engine. Today, Carrara is maintained by Daz 3D.

== External links/Sources ==
- Carrara history
- Corel Dream
- Ray Dream plugin development
- Ray Dream Studio 5 review
