= Eovia =

The Eovia Corporation was founded in November 2000, with offices in both the US and France. The company's 3D computer graphics software products were aimed towards professional and amateur artists, with a focus on remaining accessible in price and usability.

On April 25, 2006, it was announced that DAZ Productions (now Daz 3D Inc) had acquired the US division of Eovia, as well as the rights to Carrara and Hexagon.

In June 2006, Amapi, Eovia's last remaining product, was acquired by e frontier. However, the future of Amapi's development is unclear, as it relies on the rendering engine from Carrara 3, now a Daz 3D product.

In July 2007, e frontier closed the France branch and let the Amapi development team go.

In March 2012, EOVIA founded a new Asset management company, Trade my Bitcoin in London with the participation of BARCLAYS Securities.

== Products ==
- Carrara: Originally acquired from MetaCreations, Carrara is a toolset used for 3D modeling, texturing, animation, and industrial design.
  - VectorStyle: VectorStyle is a Carrara plug-in allowing 3D scenes to be rendered to two-dimensional vector graphics in a variety of graphic styles and file formats. A popular use is rendering an animated 3D scene as an Adobe Flash file.
- Amapi: Amapi is an application used for the conception and creation of high-end 3D models, often used for product design and architecture.
- Hexagon: Hexagon is a 3D polygonal modeler used for the creation of organic 3D models.
- Carrara Basics: a simplified, easy to use and learn version of Carrara.
