= Makers Empire 3D =

3D modeling computer program

- Original author: Makers Empire
- Developer: Makers Empire 3D
- Release: December 2013; 12 years ago

Stable release(s)
- Windows: 4.4.2.0
- Android: 4.4.2.0
- iOS: 4.4.2.0
- macOS: 4.4.2.0
October 7, 2019; 7 years ago
- Operating system: Windows 7 and later Android iOS; OS X 10.8 and later Chromebook mid-2016 and later
- Available in: English, Chinese (Simplified)
- Type: 3D computer graphics
- License: Freemium
- Website: www.makersempire.com

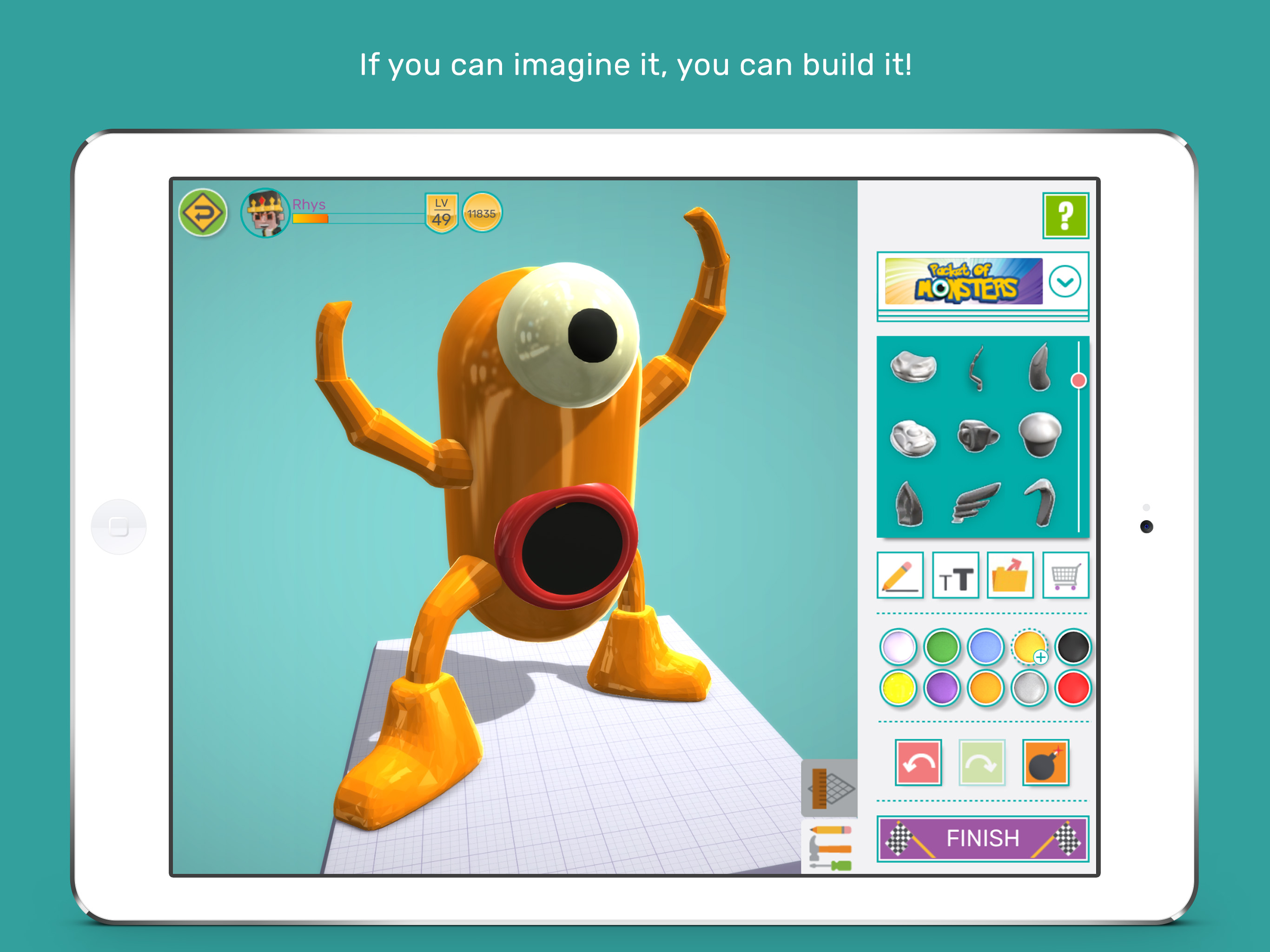
Makers Empire 3D Modeling Software.

Makers Empire 3D is a 3D modeling computer program made by Makers Empire. It is designed to introduce 4-13-year-old students to Design Thinking and engage them in STEM learning via 3D design and 3D printing. The 3D app is optimized for touch screens but can be used with and without a mouse on all major platforms.

It is available as a freeware version, Makers Empire 3D, and a paid subscription version for primary, elementary and middle schools, which includes additional features designed to help educators integrate 3D design and printing into their teaching practice.

The school subscription version includes over 150 lesson plans aligned to US Common Core standards, Next Generation Science standards, the National Curriculum (UK), and the Australian Curriculum, professional development, training and support for teachers, built in student assessment, a class management tool, analytics, and a school implementation plan.

Schools use Makers Empire to teach Design & Technology Curriculum, to teach Design Thinking and to improve students' critical thinking, problem-solving, resilience and perseverance. Students in schools have used Makers Empire in countless projects to solve problems both within their school community and beyond.

In 2017, Makers Empire partnered with Polar3D.

A notable Makers Empire project is the 'Ollie Customizer' for the Sphero Ollie.

Makers Empire was the recipient of a Bronze Award at the 2015 IMS Global Learning Impact Awards. Three of the company founders also took part in the MassChallenge business accelerator in Boston the same year.

Makers Empire is a NewSchools portfolio company and has been favorably reviewed by Common Sense Education and 3D Insider, amongst others. Makers Empire was also described as a "compelling example" of 3D printing in the 2015 Horizon Project report, an initiative by the New Media Consortium.

In late 2017, it was reported that Makers Empire had attracted $1 million in funding.

In 2018, Makers Empire was part of two large-scale rollouts of 3D printing in schools. The company partnered with Polar 3D and GE for the GE Additive Program, which delivers 3D technology to six hundred schools around the world. The company also partnered with the Education Department (South Australia) to equip 100 SA schools with a professional development program focused on 3D printing in schools. The partnership with the Education Department (SA) follows on from a pilot program with 23 schools in 2016 and a rollout to 50 schools in 2017, 100 schools in 2018 and a final 100 schools in 2019. In total, 270 schools in SA were part of the project.

In 2018, Makers Empire was selected to be part of Microsoft's first Australian accelerator program, ScaleUp, which helps start-ups fast-track their growth by linking them with potential customers, Microsoft partners and technical guidance Makers Empire also announced a partnership with Dubai education consultancy, Ibtikar, to deliver 3D technology to over 200 primary schools in the United Arab Emirates for the UAE Ministry of Education.

Also in October 2018, Macquarie University in Sydney announced the results of a 12-month research study into primary school makerspaces titled "Makerspaces in Primary School Settings - Advancing 21st Century and STEM Capabilities using 3D Design and 3D Printing." Involving three schools, 27 teachers and 500 students, it is the largest study of makerspaces in primary schools and is based on the participants using Makers Empire's 3D products for teachers and students. The study examined what children really learn in makerspaces, what supports and constrains their learning, and what teachers really need in order to effectively lead makerspaces learning environments. The research study report revealed that makerspaces can be highly effective at developing children's creativity, critical thinking, design thinking and digital skills. Students were highly engaged with the 3D technology, and the idea of solving genuine design challenges – it helped boost their confidence and resilience when dealing with setbacks, particularly for those less capable students.

In December 2018, Makers Empire was listed second in Common Sense Education's Best of EdTech 2018, after Khan Academy. This list of top 20 products was created from 170 EdTech products reviewed by the Common Sense Education team.

In 2019, Makers Empire completed the inaugural Microsoft Sydney Scaleup Program in Sydney and Toyota funded Makers Empire to run a STEM project with 3D printing and 3D design for schools in the Western suburbs of Melbourne. The company was also a finalist in the 2019 Telstra Business Awards in the Social Change category. Mandi Dimitriadis, Director of Learning at Makers Empire, also won an Winnovation Award for female game-changers for her work with the company.

In October 2019, Makers Empire received a LeanLab fellowship for a research pilot to develop an understanding of how its 3D learning program might best serve American schools.

In November 2019, Makers Empire won EduTech Asia's inaugural Pitch Competition, which gave them entry into Singapore's EduSpaze Accelerator, designed to help Makers Empire explore opportunities in South East Asia.

As of January 2020, Makers Empire's 3D app has been used to create almost 15 million 3D designs. The app is used by 1 million users in forty countries.

In March 2020, Makers Empire was certified by the Education Alliance Finland for pedagogical quality.

In response to the COVID-19 pandemic in 2020 and global school closures, Makers Empire launched a free Learning at Home course for teachers, students and their families.

In 2021, Makers Empire introduced curriculum-aligned in-app challenge courses, comprising custom videos, quizzes, design tutorials and challenges based around a theme or topic. They are designed as a complete program of work and can be taught over a school term.

As of January 2023, the Makers Empire app was being used by 3.2 million students in 50+ countries.

The University of South Australia (UniSA) announced the results of a research study involving Makers Empire and Australian primary school students. Students showed a significant improvement in spatial reasoning skills, engagement in STEM and self-determination, as well as a reduction in STEM anxiety after using the app, leading researchers to conclude that gamified education might be the key to boosting STEM capabilities in upper primary school students. The research findings were published in the International Journal of Technology and Design Education in mid 2023.

During 2023, Makers Empire delivered a national Kids in Space program with the Andy Thomas Space Foundation and the Australian Space Agency. The program involved 70 schools and 10,000 students across Australia in every state and territory.

In July 2023, Makers Empire was certified as a B Corporation by B Lab, showing the company's commitment to being a force for good.
