= ScanIP =

3D image processing software

Synopsys Simpleware ScanIP
- Screenshot of Simpleware ScanIP
- Developer: Synopsys
- Stable release: S-2021.06 / 8 June 2021; 4 years ago
- Operating system: Windows; Linux
- License: Commercial
- Website: www.synopsys.com/simpleware/products/software/scanip.html

Synopsys Simpleware ScanIP is a 3D image processing and model generation software program developed by Synopsys Inc. to visualise, analyse, quantify, segment and export 3D image data from magnetic resonance imaging (MRI), computed tomography (CT), microtomography and other modalities for computer-aided design (CAD), finite element analysis (FEA), computational fluid dynamics (CFD), and 3D printing. The software is used in the life sciences, materials science, nondestructive testing, reverse engineering and petrophysics.

Segmented images can be exported in the STL file format, surface meshes and point clouds, to CAD and 3D printing or, with the FE module, exported as surface/volume meshes directly into leading computer-aided engineering (CAE) solvers. The CAD and NURBS add-on modules can be used to integrate CAD objects into image data, and to convert scan data into NURBS-based models for CAD. The SOLID, FLOW and LAPLACE add-on modules can be used to calculate effective material properties from scanned samples using homogenisation techniques. Since 2020, Simpleware software has included Simpleware AS Ortho and Simpleware AS Cardio, modules for automated segmentation of medical image data that uses artificial intelligence-based machine learning. In addition, a fully customizable module, Simpleware Custom Modeler, is available.

== Application areas ==
Screenshot of component being placed in hip model in Simpleware ScanIP

=== Life sciences ===
Simpleware ScanIP generates high-quality 3D models from image data suitable for a wide range of design and simulation applications related to life sciences. Image data from sources like MRI and CT can be visualised, analysed, segmented and quantified, before being exported as CAD, CAE and 3D printing models. Different tissues, bones and other parts of the body can be identified using a wide range of segmentation and processing tools in the software. Options are also available for integrating CAD and image data, enabling medical device research to be conducted into how CAD-designed implants interact with the human body. High-quality CAE models can similarly be used in biomechanics research to simulate movement and the effect of different forces on anatomies. An example of this is the US Naval Research Laboratory/Simpleware head model, generated from high-resolution MRI scans and segmented to create data that can be easily meshed to suit specific finite element (FE) applications, such as head impact and concussion.

Applications for the software have included researching implant positioning, statistical shape analysis, and computational fluid dynamics analysis of blood flow in vascular networks. With Simpleware's scripting tools, it is possible to explore the best positioning for hip implants. 3D models can be used to analyse patellofemoral kinematics. Simpleware-generated human body models can be used to simulate the effect of electromagnetic radiation in MRI scanners. Other application areas for models created within Simpleware's software environment include simulating transcranial direct current stimulation, and testing electrode placements for treating epilepsy. In terms of dental research, evaluations of dental implants have been made by integrating CAD objects with anatomical data and exporting for simulation.

=== Medical devices ===
Simpleware ScanIP Medical is a version of the software intended for use as a medical device. It has 510(k) market clearance from the U.S. Food and Drug Administration (FDA) as a Class II Medical Device, as well as CE marking and ISO 13485 certifications.

Simpleware ScanIP Medical is intended for use as a software interface and image segmentation system for the transfer of medical imaging information to an output file. It is also intended as pre-operative software for diagnostic and surgical planning. For these purposes, output files can also be used for the fabrication of physical replicas using traditional or additive manufacturing methods. The physical replicas can be used for diagnostic purposes in the field of orthopedic, maxillofacial and cardiovascular applications. The software is intended to be used in conjunction with other diagnostic tools and expert clinical judgment.

Those that still want to use Synopsys Simpleware ScanIP for non-clinical medical applications, such as research in the Life Sciences, are recommended to use the core Synopsys Simpleware ScanIP package, which is not intended for clinical use.

=== Natural sciences, including paleontology and functional morphology ===
Simpleware ScanIP is used to reconstruct anatomies from scan data for the investigation of different biological and other organic processes within the Natural Sciences. Paleontological uses of ScanIP include the reconstruction of dinosaur skeletons, while the software has been used to generate a model of a shark head suitable for rapid prototyping and testing of how sharks smell, and for generating STL models of a pseudomorph suitable for 3D printing. ScanIP has also been used for biomimicry projects for the Eden Project, and for producing artworks inspired by morphology. ScanIP can be used to reverse engineer ant necks to improve understanding of their mechanics.

=== Materials Science ===
Simpleware ScanIP has extensive applications in different materials sciences and manufacturing workflows where researchers investigate the properties of scanned samples. Scans of composites and other samples can be visualised and processed in ScanIP, enabling multiple phases and porous networks to be explored and analysed. Measurements can be taken, for example, of fractures and cracks, and statistics generated for porosity distribution and other features. ScanIP can be combined with the FE module to generate volume meshes for FE and CFD characterisation of stress or strain distribution, permeability and other material properties. Example applications include fuel cell characterisation, and modelling the effect of porosity on the elastic properties of synthetic graphite.

=== Petrophysics ===
Simpleware ScanIP is used in the oil and gas industry for generating 3D models from scans of core samples and rocks. Image data taken from CT, micro-CT, Focused ion beam Scanning electron microscope scans and other imaging modalities can be imported and visualised, enabling exploration of pore networks, segmentation of regions of interest, and measurement and quantification of features. Processed data can be exported using the FE module as volume meshes for FEA and CFD in solvers, allowing for insights into fluid-structure-analysis and other geomechanical properties.

=== Nondestructive testing (NDT) ===
ScanIP can be used to create computational models suitable for detailed visualisation, analysis and export for simulation in CAE solvers. Scanned image data can be easily processed to identify regions of interest, measure defects, quantify statistics such as porosity, and generate CAD and CAE models. Example applications include research into characterising composites, foams, and food.

=== Reverse engineering ===
Screenshot of cylinder head registration in Simpleware ScanIP

With ScanIP, it is possible to reverse engineer legacy parts and other geometries that cannot be accurately created in CAD. Scans of objects can be visualised and processed in ScanIP to learn more about their original design, and exported as FE and CFD models for simulation of physical properties. The software has applications in aerospace, automotive and other fields needing to generate accurate 3D models from scans. Other applications include being able to reverse engineer consumer products in order to analyse their properties, or study how they interact with the human body without the need for invasive testing.

=== 3D printing ===
ScanIP is capable of generating robust STL files for 3D printing, including for medical applications. Files created using ScanIP feature guaranteed watertight triangulations and correct norms, as well as options for volume and topology preserving smoothing. STL files are generated with conforming interfaces, enabling multi-material printing. Internal structures, otherwise known as lattices, can also be added to 3D models of parts in order to reduce weight prior to additive manufacturing. Example applications include research into 3D printed medical devices, lattice support structure generation, and research into 3D organs. ScanIP was used to generate STL files of a man's kidney to help visualize options before a minor procedure at Southampton General Hospital. Lattice techniques have also been used for developing new parts in aerospace, automotive and other industries.

== Add-on modules ==
=== Simpleware FE Module ===
The FE module generates volume meshes with conforming multi-parts for FEA and CFD. Finite element contacts, node sets and shell elements can be defined, as can boundary conditions for computational fluid dynamics. Material properties can be assigned based on greyscale values or pre-set values. Users can decide between a grid-based or a free meshing approach. Meshes can be exported directly into leading Computer-aided engineering solvers without the need for further processing. The result can be exported to ABAQUS (.inp files), ANSYS (.ans files), COMSOL Multiphysics (.mphtxt files), I-DEAS (.unv files), LS-DYNA (.dyn files), MSC (.out files), FLUENT (.msh files)

=== Simpleware AS Ortho Module ===
The Simpleware AS Ortho (Auto Segmentation for Orthopedics) module uses Artificial Intelligence-based Machine Learning for automated segmentation of hips, knees, and ankles. The module enables users to segment bones and/or cartilage, including common landmarks. Hip segmentation from CT scans includes: proximal femurs, pelvis, and sacrum, with hip landmarks placed on the pelvis, coccyx, and femurs. For knee segmentation from PD weighted MRI scans and CT, regions of interest include: femur, tibia, and associated cartilage, patella, and fibula, with knee landmarks placed on the femur and tibia. Ankle CT data is also covered, including the talus, calcaneus, tibia, and fibula, and landmarks for the ankle center, fibular notch, lateral and medial malleolus.

=== Simpleware AS Cardio Module ===
AS Cardio provides an easy-to-use tool to automatically segment cardiovascular data. In this specific release, we focus on heart segmentation from CT including blood pool cavities, selected muscle tissue as well as common key landmarks such as the right ventricle, tricuspid valve, and the atrial appendages.

=== Simpleware Custom Modeler ===
This module is an automated solution for users, which is developed with Simpleware engineers to tailor the software to their current processes. The module enables custom automated segmentation to be set up, as well as options for fully automated: image processing, landmarking, measurements, statistics and reports, workflows for meshing models and export to 3D printing, CAD, and simulation, among other features.

=== Simpleware CAD Module ===
The CAD module allows for the import and interactive positioning of CAD models within image data. The resulting combined models can then be exported as multi-part STLs or, using the FE module, converted automatically into multi-part finite element or CFD meshes. Internal structures can also be added to data to reduce weight whilst maintaining mechanical strength. With CAD, users can avoid having to work with image-based files in CAD-based software. Data can be acquired from ScanIP, IGES (.iges and .igs files), STEP (.step and .stp files), STL (.stl files). The result can be saved in ScanIP files for further processing or exported to STL (.stl files).

=== Simpleware NURBS Module ===
The NURBS module allows segmented 3D image data to be fitted with non-uniform rational B-splines (NURBS) using automated patch fitting techniques for export as IGES (.iges and .igs files). Autosurface algorithms provide a straightforward route from image data to CAD-ready NURBS models, with options available for contour and curvature detection. CAD geometries can also be inspected prior to export to remove spurious features.

=== Simpleware Design Link ===
This module allows users of Simpleware software and SolidWorks to harness the power of both software packages and speed up product development workflows.

=== Simpleware SOLID Module ===
The SOLID module calculates the effective stiffness tensor and individual elastic moduli of material samples. Perform numerical homogenisation with a built-in FE solver or derive quick semi-analytical estimates from segmented images.

=== Simpleware FLOW Module ===
The FLOW module calculates the absolute permeability tensor of porous material samples. Numerical homogenisation is performed using a built-in Stokes solver.

=== Simpleware LAPLACE Module ===
The LAPLACE module calculates the effective electrical, thermal and molecular properties of materials whose behaviour is governed by the Laplace's equation. Perform numerical homogenisation with a built-in FE solver or derive quick semi-analytical estimates from segmented images.

== Import formats ==
- DICOM version 3.0 and 2D stacks - including 4D (timeresolved) DICOM with time step selection – option to store DICOM tags with imported data
- ACR-NEMA (versions 1 and 2)
- DICONDE
- Interfile
- Analyze
- Meta-image
- Raw image data (binary, CSV...)
- 2D image stacks (BMP, GIF...)
- Natively supported pixel types: 8-bit Unsigned Integer; 16-bit Unsigned Integer; 16-bit Signed Integer; 32-bit Floating Point

== Export formats ==
Background image export

- RAW image format
- MetaImage
- Stack of images (BMP, JPG, PNG, TIF)
- DICOM

Segmented image

- Raw image format
- MetaImage

Surface model (triangles)

- STL
- IGES
- ACIS (SAT)
- ANSYS surface mesh
- ABAQUS surface mesh
- Open Inventor
- Point cloud
- MATLAB file surface

Animations

- AVI
- Ogg Theora
- H.264/MPEG-4 AVC
- Windows Media Video Advanced Systems Format
- PNG sequence
- Transparent PNG sequence

2D and 3D screenshot

- JPEG
- Portable Network Graphics
- VRML
- Postscript (*.eps)
- BMP
- PNM
- PDF

Others

- Generate Virtual X-Ray, with object burn in (ScanIP Medical version only)
- Export scene (export the current 3D view) - 3D PDF; VRML
