= MetaCreations =

American software company

- Type: Software Developer
- Founded: Fractal Design Corp (1991); Harvard Systems Corp (1987)
- Headquarters: Carpinteria, CA
- Footnotes; Rebranded Viewpoint Corporation in 1999

MetaCreations was a computer software company that was best known for its graphics applications, notably Ray Dream Studio/Infini D, Fractal Design Painter, Bryce, and Kai's Power Tools.

== History ==
MetaCreations was founded in 1997 by the mergers of MetaTools, Fractal Design Corporation, Ray Dream, Specular, and Real Time Geometry Lab (RTG). John Wilczak and Mark Zimmer led the initial operations. Wilczak left the company in 1998. The software and GUI designer, highly valued creative head for his contributions to the public brand appearance, Kai Krause (MetaTools, Goo-Series, KPT, ...) left shortly afterwards in 1999.

In 1999, MetaCreations invested itself heavily in the newly developed '3d on the Web' technology "MetaStream" and began restructuring from graphics applications to Internet technology. MetaCreations formed a subsidiary company called MetaStream, acquired Viewpoint Digital, and ultimately merged all operations together to become the Viewpoint Corporation. (The name Viewpoint derives from Viewpoint DataLabs International, Inc. which was a 1988 founded enterprise that specialized in the area of digitalisation and modelling for the movie industry like for Star Trek, and it got under the hood of Computer Associates in 1998.) The newly formed Viewpoint Corporation divested itself of all former MetaCreations graphics products to push MetaStream technology.

In 2000, Enliven bought all not-yet-possessed shares of Viewpoint Digital Inc. from Computer Associates International Inc. which held about 17.7% of the full daughter Metastream Corporation at that time. In the process of this Viewpoint got declared the Consumer Products division of the Enliven Marketing Technologies Corporation. Further Viewpoint's NASDAQ stock ticker symbol changed from VWPT to ENLV to reflect the company's name change in January 2008. Enliven was then acquired by DG FastChannel for $98 million, in a stock-for-stock transaction.

== Products ==
- Ray Dream Studio and Specular Infini-D were succeeded by Carrara, which was sold to Eovia and subsequently acquired by Daz 3D.
- MetaTools' Bryce was sold to Corel and subsequently acquired by Daz 3D.
- Fractal Design's Poser was sold to Curious Labs, which was itself acquired by e-Frontier and finally Smith Micro Software.
- MetaCreations' Canoma was acquired by Adobe Systems. It was discontinued and its technology folded into other products.
- Fractal Design's Painter was acquired by Corel.
- Fractal Design's Expression reverted to its original developer, Creature House, who later sold the product to Microsoft. It is now sold as Microsoft Expression Design, part of the Microsoft Expression Studio suite.
- Kai's Photo Soap, Kai's Power Goo (later SuperGoo), and Kai's Power Show were acquired by ScanSoft, Inc.. They have been discontinued.
- In 1999 Minolta marketed the Minolta Dimâge 3D 1500, a modular digital camera based on the Minolta Dimâge EX 1500 incorporating MetaCreations' MetaFlash technology to achieve 3D image-capturing capabilities.
