= 3DCrafter =

3D modelling and animation tool

- Developer: Amabilis Software
- Stable release: 10.2 / August 23, 2017; 8 years ago
- Written in: C#
- Operating system: Microsoft Windows
- Type: 3D computer graphics
- License: Proprietary
- Website: www.amabilis.com/products

3DCrafter (previously 3D Canvas) is a real-time 3D modelling and animation tool developed by Amabilis Software. A Canadian software company. It is available in 3 different versions - 3DCrafter, 3DCrafter Plus, and 3DCrafter Pro. 3DCrafter is freeware, whereas the Plus and Pro upgrades cost. The software is designed to be user-friendly and has an easy-to-use drag-and-drop interface. 3DCrafter is written in C# and uses Direct3D 11.

Since 2026, the 3DCrafter website has shutdown.

== 3DCrafter Pro ==
The paid variant of the freeware, it offers a wider options in both import formats and export formats. It also supports additional operations that are not available in the free version, like boolean operation and animation operation. It also includes a built-in rendering engine.
