= SolidThinking =

solidThinking Inc.
- Type: 3D Modeling Software
- Website: www.solidthinking.com

solidThinking was a software company developing Evolve, a 3D modeling and rendering software and Inspire, a concept generation tool.

== History ==
Brothers Alessandro Mazzardo and Mario Mazzardo started the solidThinking project in 1991 with Guido Quaroni, who later become Vice President of Software R&D at Pixar Animation Studios. The design software was originally developed for NEXTSTEP, the operating system developed by NeXT, and it was soon awarded as the best new application in the "CAD and 3D" category at NeXTWORLD EXPO held in San Francisco in June 1993.

A complete re-write of the application for the Windows platform was completed in 1998 with the release of solidThinking 3.0 for Windows. The Construction History and an extensive NURBS modeling toolset were the main additions. One year later solidThinking for Mac OS X was also released, with all successive releases developed simultaneously for both Windows and Mac OS X.

solidThinking version 8.0 and solidThinking Inspired 8.0, introduced the morphogenesis form-generation technology, were released in September 2009.

With the 9.0 release, solidThinking became Evolve and solidThinking Inspired became Inspire, both sold under the solidThinking brand.

The software was later acquired by Altair Engineering in 2008, which was subsequently acquired by Siemens in March 2025.
