= Viewpoint Media Player =

Viewpoint Media Player (VMP) is a browser graphics rendering plug-in originally produced by Viewpoint Corporation, a subsidiary of the marketing company Digital Generation, Inc. (Nasdaq: DGIT). A predecessor of VMP is the browser plug-in MetaStream from the once acquired company MetaCreations.

== Description ==
Viewpoint Media Player is a web browser plug-in that enables users to view 3D content and other rich media, such as Flash content and video, on the Internet. Viewpoint Media Player has been included with various products from AOL, including AOL Instant Messenger (AIM).

Some companies, ranging from online retailers to auto manufacturers, have used Viewpoint Media Player as the graphics platform for interactive 3D tours of their products. The player was used to power the Scion configurator on the Build Your Scion website, which won the People's Voice Webby Award in the Automotive category in 2006.

== Adware concerns ==
Viewpoint Media Player is sometimes marked as adware due to the program commonly being installed without user notification or intervention. If Viewpoint is removed whilst a program requiring it remains installed, it again re-installs silently without notifying the user. The Viewpoint Media Player itself does not directly collect user identifiable information, unless the user enters it. The license agreement states that the software collects information about the user's interactions with advertisements, as well as the browser and operating system in use. The privacy policy also states that the plug-in collects some browsing history by way of referrer information. This information is collected by Viewpoint along with a unique identifying code.

== Browser hijacking ==
Allowing Viewpoint Media Player to update installs the Viewpoint Manager program, which runs in the background unless disabled. When installed, this application attempts to install the Viewpoint Toolbar in Internet Explorer every day, overriding any previously installed toolbars. The install is shown as a recommended browser "upgrade" from Viewpoint. The update and original Terms of Service do not indicate that a browser toolbar will be installed.
