= Daz Studio =

3D graphics software

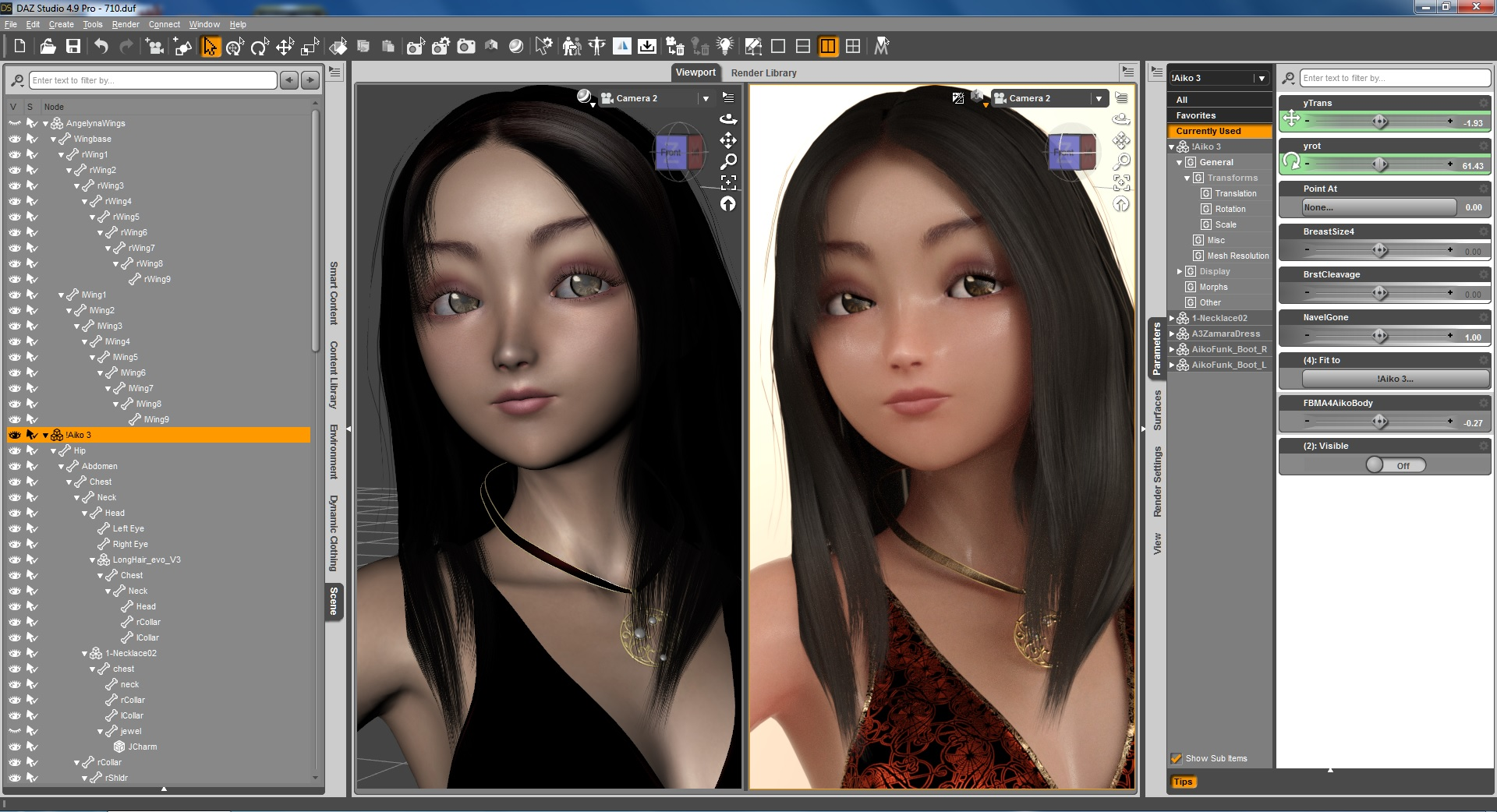
- User interface of Daz Studio Version 4.9.0.63
- Original author: Daz 3D
- Developer: Daz 3D
- Initial release: 2005; 21 years ago
- Stable release: 4.24.0.3 / April 29, 2025; 13 months ago
- Preview release: 6.25.2025.22607 / August 14, 2025; 9 months ago
- Operating system: Windows Vista or later Mac OS X 10.6 or later
- Platform: IA-32 and x86-64
- Size: About 1.5 GB: 1.17 GB for Daz Studio 4.12.; 356.4 MB for the Genesis 8 Female Starter Essentials.; 406.6 MB for the Genesis 8 Male Starter Essentials.
- Type: 3D computer graphics
- License: Proprietary software: Professional edition: Freeware
- Website: www.daz3d.com/daz_studio/

Daz Studio is freeware media design software developed by Daz 3D. Daz Studio is a 3D scene creation and rendering application that can be used to produce images and videos. Renders can be done by leveraging either the 3Delight render engine, or the Iray render engine, both of which are included for free with Daz Studio, or with a variety of purchasable add-on render engine plugins for Daz Studio from various vendors and companies.

Daz Studio also supports importing and exporting of files in various file formats for 3D objects and animations. This allows for the use of other 3D content within Daz Studio, as well as the ability to export content out of Daz Studio for use in other 3D applications.

In 2017, Daz 3D also began offering Hexagon and Daz Studio together for free.

== Genesis figure technology ==
One of the main differences between Daz Studio and other software applications such as Poser is that Daz 3D has also included support for its various generations of the "Genesis" technology, which is used as the basis for its human figures.

Daz 3D has had many versions of its human figures and characters, but in 2011, they launched a significant change in the underlying technology. Instead of each figure being designed individually, Daz 3D moved to their Genesis platform, in which figures were derived as morphs from the base mesh. Two of the key differences that this technology created were: The ability for characters to be blended into a huge variety of shapes; and since these shapes were all derived from a common base, add-on content like clothing, hair, and additional morphs would not only work on all characters but could actually change with the characters.

The Genesis platform has gone through several versions since its launch in 2011:

Genesis 2: One of the shortcomings of the Genesis platform was that although it allowed for extremely flexible characters and clothing, it also toned down some of the elements that made a male or female figure unique. Genesis 2 changed this by splitting the Genesis base figure into two separate base figures: Genesis 2 Male and Genesis 2 Female.

Genesis 3: Up until Genesis 3, the Genesis figures had been using TriAx Weight Maps, where many other industry platforms were using Dual Quaternion. This changed in Genesis 3 to allow Daz 3D figures to be more compatible with other 3D software platforms as well as Game Development platforms.

Genesis 8: The jump in version naming from Genesis 3 to Genesis 8 was in order to address confusion in naming conventions. Although Genesis had reached its fourth version, most of the Daz 3D flagship characters were now in their eighth version. In order to avoid the confusion of Victoria 8 or Michael 8 being Genesis 4 characters, Daz 3D shifted the versioning of Genesis to match the character versions. Genesis 8 also includes significant changes in the figure's backward compatibility with previous generations and their content, as well as Joint and muscle bends and flexing and facial expressions.

Genesis 9: Genesis 9 was released in October 2022.

== History and overview ==
Daz Studio is designed to allow users to manipulate relatively ready-to-use models and figures as well as other supporting 3D content. It is aimed at users who are interested in posing human and non-human figures for illustrations and animation. It was created as an alternative to Poser, the industry-leading software used for character manipulation and rendering. Daz 3D began its business model selling 3D models of human beings (and a few non-humans), as well as occasionally giving away some of the more popular base models for free, along with clothing and props for them. All of these models were constructed to be used in Poser. Daz eventually created their own character-manipulation software, first for sale and later distributed for free (originally just the base edition, but eventually even the "pro" version). Initially, Daz Studio handled the same file formats that Poser did, but Daz eventually introduced Daz Studio-specific character and file formats, though Daz can still import Poser files.

Daz 3D follows the "Razor and blades business model"; Daz Studio is the "razor", a free-of-charge core program with the required features for the creation of imagery and animations, while relegating other features to the "blades", add-on plug-ins, usually commercial, which the user may add. Initially, it was possible to easily create new content in another Daz program, Carrara. Beginning in 2017, Daz 3D began offering another programs, Hexagon, packaging it with Daz Studio.

In October 2017, Daz Studio added to the free offer the dForce physics engine, which Daz Studio uses to simulate cloth, wind, gravity, and collisions.

== See also ==
- List of 3D modeling software
