= CityEngine =

3D modeling software

ArcGIS CityEngine
- Screenshot of CityEngine
- Original authors: Pascal Mueller, Simon Haegler, Andreas Ulmer, Simon Schubiger, Matthias Specht, Stefan Müller Arisona, Basil Weber
- Developers: Esri R&D Center Zurich
- Initial release: August 2008
- Stable release: 2024.1 / November, 2024
- Preview release: 2025.0 BETA / May 2025
- Operating system: Windows, Linux
- Available in: English, Finnish, Simplified Chinese
- Type: 3D computer graphics, geodesign, procedural generation
- License: Proprietary (Named User, Node-Locked or floating)
- Website: www.esri.com/en-us/arcgis/products/arcgis-cityengine/overview

ArcGIS CityEngine is a commercial 3D modeling program. Developed by Esri R&D Center Zurich (formerly Procedural Inc.), it specializes in the generation of 3D urban environments to support the creation of detailed large-scale 3D city models. Unlike traditional 3D modeling methodology, which uses computer-aided design (CAD) tools and techniques, CityEngine takes a procedural modeling approach which shapes generation via a rules-based system. Due to its integration with the wider ArcGIS platform, CityEngine can also be used with geographic information system (GIS) datasets.

CityEngine can be used for urban planning and architecture, graphics visualization, game development, entertainment, and archeology. CityEngine can be used to visualize the building information modeling (BIM) data of buildings in a larger urban context, making for more realistic construction projects.

== History and releases ==
=== Software history ===
ArcGIS CityEngine, originally named Esri CityEngine, was developed at Swiss technology university ETH Zurich by Pascal Mueller, the co-founder and CEO of Procedural Inc. While researching for his PhD at the ETH Computer Vision Lab, Mueller invented a number of techniques for procedural modeling of 3D architecture that make up the foundation of CityEngine. CityEngine publicly debuted at the 2001 SIGGRAPH conference; since then, additional research papers have been published that have contributed to CityEngine and its features. The first commercial version of CityEngine was released in 2008. In 2007, Procedural Inc. was founded and separated from ETH Zurich, the top-ranking technology university in Switzerland. In the summer of 2011, Procedural Inc. was acquired by Esri Inc., becoming Esri R&D Center Zurich. Esri CityEngine was renamed to ArcGIS CityEngine in June 2020 to officially make it a part of the ArcGIS software suite.

=== Releases ===
Date	Version
July 21, 2008	CityEngine 2008
Nov 20, 2008	CityEngine 2008.2
Dec 17, 2008	CityEngine 2008.3
May 19, 2009	CityEngine 2009
Sept 15, 2009	CityEngine 2009.2
Dec 10, 2009	CityEngine 2009.3
June 23, 2010	CityEngine 2010
Oct 12, 2010	CityEngine 2010.2
Dec 9, 2010	CityEngine 2010.3
Oct 26, 2011	Esri CityEngine 2011.1
Feb 23, 2012	Esri CityEngine 2011.2
Oct 3, 2012	Esri CityEngine 2012.1
Nov 13, 2013	Esri CityEngine 2013.1
June 1, 2014	Esri CityEngine 2014
Sept 15, 2014	Esri CityEngine 2014.1
----,----	Esri CityEngine 2015.0
----,----	Esri CityEngine 2015.1
----,----	Esri CityEngine 2015.2
----,----	Esri CityEngine 2016.0
----,----	Esri CityEngine 2016.1
----,----	Esri CityEngine 2017.0
Nov 7, 2017	Esri CityEngine 2017.1
May 10, 2018	Esri CityEngine 2018.0
Sept 18, 2018	Esri CityEngine 2018.1
May 14, 2019	Esri CityEngine 2019.0
October, 2019	Esri CityEngine 2019.1
June, 2020	ArcGIS CityEngine 2020.0
November, 2020	ArcGIS CityEngine 2020.1
March, 2021	ArcGIS CityEngine 2021.0 BETA
June, 2021	ArcGIS CityEngine 2021.0
August, 2021	ArcGIS CityEngine 2021.1 BETA
----,----	ArcGIS CityEngine 2021.1
April, 2022	ArcGIS CityEngine 2022.0 BETA
June, 2022	ArcGIS CityEngine 2022.0
September, 2022	ArcGIS CityEngine 2022.1 BETA
October, 2022	ArcGIS CityEngine 2022.1
June, 2023	ArcGIS CityEngine 2023.0
October, 2023	ArcGIS CityEngine 2023.1 BETA
November, 2023	ArcGIS CityEngine 2023.1
May, 2024	ArcGIS CityEngine 2024.0 BETA
July, 2024	ArcGIS CityEngine 2024.0
September, 2024	ArcGIS CityEngine 2024.1 BETA
November, 2024	ArcGIS CityEngine 2024.1
May, 2025	ArcGIS CityEngine 2025.0 BETA

=== Licensing and pricing ===
ArcGIS CityEngine is included in the Professional and Professional Plus tiers of ArcGIS Online. Pricing may vary by region and distributors. In the US, the professional tier costs US$2,200 per year; in the UK, it is £4,200 per year (excluding VAT). CityEngine can be purchased elsewhere via a local Esri partner. Once purchased, users can download and obtain license details from the MyEsri portal.

== Features ==
- CGA (computer generated architecture) parametric modeling rules to control mass, geometry assets, proportions, or texturing of buildings or streets on a citywide scale
- Select a target location and import geo-referenced satellite imagery and 3D terrain of the location to more quickly build accurate urban environments through OpenStreetMap integration
- Interactively control specific street or building parameters, such as height or age
- Import/export geo-spatial/vector data with industry-standard formats such as Esri Shapefile, File Geodatabase, and OpenStreetMap, as well as file formats for WebGL, KMZ, Collada, Autodesk FBX, Autodesk Maya, 3DS, Wavefront OBJ, RenderMan RIB, Alembic, e-on software's Vue, Universal Scene Description USD, Khronos Group GLTF, Unreal Engine, and Unreal Datasmith
- Script and generate rules-based reports to show socioeconomic figures (e.g., Gross Floor Area (GFA) and Floor Area Ratio (FAR)) to analyze their urban design proposals.
- VR viewing of modeled environments with Samsung Gear VR
- Use a variety of materials through the Esri materials library

== Procedural modeling ==
ArcGIS CityEngine uses a procedural modeling approach to automatically generate models through a predefined rule set. The rules are defined through a CGA shape grammar system, enabling the creation of complex parametric models. Users can change or add the shape grammar as needed.

Urban environments can be modeled within CityEngine by starting with creating a street network (either from the street drawing tool or with data imported from map data). Then, lots may be subdivided as many times as specified, resulting in a map of multiple lots and streets. CityEngine can then be instructed to start generating the buildings using defined procedural modeling rules. At this point, the city model can be re-designed and adjusted by changing the parameters or the shape grammar.

=== Geodesign ===
Though CityEngine is not an analytical tool like GIS, discussions about geodesign often mention the use of ArcGIS CityEngine. As it can be used to enhance 3D shape generation in ArcGIS, ArcGIS CityEngine is a critical product to improve the applicability of geodesign by using geospatial information to design or analyze a city.

== Applications ==
=== Urban design and planning ===
Garsdale Design used ArcGIS CityEngine in the creation of city master plans in Iraq before 2013, both to model existing historic areas and also model future plans. Larger companies like Foster+Partners and HOK Architects have also used CityEngine in their urban planning projects.

=== Urban and environmental studies ===
Because its primary feature is building informative city models, some urban researchers use CityEngine to compare land-use planning schemes, for example in very dense global cities such as Hong Kong and Seoul. Environmental scientists can also utilize the instant 3D model generation in CityEngine, which can make for more convenient informative research than modeling a city by creating each building individually.

=== Game development ===
CityEngine can be used as a tool in the creation of video games that require detailed 3D environments to assign interactive scripts.

=== Movie industry ===
Zootopia (also known outside of the US as Zootopolis), which won the 2016 Academy Award for Best Animated Feature Film, used CityEngine to model the city in its movie. multi-scaling city, the designers used CityEngine due to its rule-based system. CityEngine was also used to create Big Hero 6's San-Fransokyo.

=== Military ===
Due to its integration with the Esri product suite and its ability to process geospatial data to create 3D scenes/maps, CityEngine can be used within military/defense organizations.

== List of movies and TV shows using CityEngine ==
Studios and companies rarely state what software they use in their pipelines. When CityEngine is mentioned as a tool in production, it's often in a small reference in a larger article.

TV/Movie	Title	Studio/Publisher	Year	Reference
TV	The Witcher	Netflix	2020	
Movie	Blade Runner 2049	Warner Bros.	2017	
Movie	Independence Day: Resurgence	20th Century Fox	2016	
Movie	Zootopia/Zootroplis	Disney	2016	
Movie	Big Hero 6	Disney	2014	
Movie	Superman: Man of Steel	Warner Bros.	2013	
Movie	Cars*	Pixar	2006	
Movie	Guardians of the Galaxy*	Marvel	2014	
TV	Westworld	HBO**		

* Movies only claimed to use CityEngine by a single Esri employee
** Presented at FMX 2025 workshop

== Ports ==
ArcGIS CityEngine is built on top of Eclipse IDE, and has therefore able to be used on Windows and Linux operating systems. Support for macOS was stopped in March 2021.

== Plugins and extensions ==
ArcGIS CityEngine currently works with a number of third party 3D modeling, rendering, and analytical software products via its SDK and API; these currently are:

- ArcGIS CityEngine for ArcGIS Urban: ArcGIS Urban Suite
- Puma: ArcGIS CityEngine for Rhinoceros 3D
- Palladio: ArcGIS CityEngine for Houdini
- Serlio: ArcGIS CityEngine for Maya
- PyPRT: ArcGIS CityEngine for Python

ArcGIS CityEngine provides a Python scripting interface built on Jython (current version 2.7.0) which allows users to create their own tools and functionality.

== Publications ==
- ACM Siggraph 2001: Procedural Modeling of Cities - Yoav Parish and Pascal Mueller
- ACM Siggraph 2006: Procedural Modeling of Buildings - Pascal Mueller, Peter Wonka, Simon Haegler, Andreas Ulmer and Luc Van Gool
- ACM Siggraph 2007: Image-based Procedural Modeling of Facades - Pascal Mueller, Gang Zeng, Peter Wonka and Luc Van Gool
- ACM Siggraph 2008: Interactive Procedural Street Modeling - Guoning Chen, Gregory Esch, Peter Wonka, Pascal Mueller and Eugene Zhang
- Eurographics 2009: Interactive Geometric Simulation of 4D Cities - Basil Weber, Pascal Mueller, Peter Wonka and Markus Gross
- Eurographics Symposium VAST 2006: Procedural 3D Reconstruction of Puuc Buildings in Xkipché - Pascal Mueller, Tijl Vereenooghe, Peter Wonka, Iken Paap and Luc Van Gool
- Eurographics Symposium VAST 2007: Populating Ancient Pompeii with Crowds of Virtual Romans - Jonathan Maïm, Simon Haegler, Barbara Yersin, Pascal Mueller, Daniel Thalmann and Luc Van Gool

== See also ==
- Geodesign
- Procedural modeling
