= Silo (software) =

- Developer: Nevercenter
- Stable release: 2022.3 / 2022; 3 years ago
- Operating system: macOS, Microsoft Windows, Linux
- Type: 3D computer graphics
- License: Proprietary
- Website: www.nevercenter.com/silo/

Silo is a polygon/subdivision surfaces 3D modeling application created by Nevercenter. It has a focus on quick editing, a customizable interface (all mouse buttons and keyboard shortcuts can be assigned to any function), and a flexible workflow.

Silo 2, released in August 2007, added a high-polygon sculpting mode for creating normal maps and displacement maps, as well as improved texture mapping tools and scene management tools. Version 2.1 was released on August 13, 2008.

== Overview ==
Silo 2 is a software that is devoted to modeling. It is normally used as part of a workflow along with a number of other software packages because Silo alone cannot perform tasks like texturing and animation. It can be used for anything from creating 3D characters for video games and movies to exploring 3D architectural ideas. Silo also features an uncluttered design with a minimalistic user interface. It supports import and export of .sia, .sib, .obj, .3ds, .dxf, .fac, .dae, and .fbx, as well as the export only of .stl, .pov, and .rib.
