= Animation:Master =

3D character animation software

- Developer: Hash, Inc.
- Stable release: 19.5d / December 1, 2024; 19 months ago
- Operating system: Microsoft Windows, Mac OS X
- Type: 3D computer graphics
- License: Proprietary
- Website: www.hash.com

Animation:Master is a 3D character animation application offered by Hash, Inc. that includes tools for modeling, rigging, animating, texturing, lighting and rendering. Although Animation:Master was developed for and is targeted towards independent artists, with a workflow optimized to enable one artist to create a rendered animated piece from start to finish, the workflow also presents economic advantages for larger workgroups.

The software uses a proprietary spline mesh technology to perform modeling and animation, and it is different in this sense from polygon mesh or NURBS-based programs. The system used is called patch-based modeling. It uses multiple intersecting splines to create surfaces, called patches. Patches present an efficiency in that one patch can describe a complex curved surface that would require many facets to approximate in flat polygons.

To learn more about Animation:Master's features, see Animation:Master Features.

== Version history ==
Animation:Master is the successor program to Martin Hash's Animation:Apprentice (1987) and Animation:Journeyman (1990)

Version 1 (1992) was marketed as "Will Vinton's Playmation" in conjunction with the Will Vinton Studio. The Mac version was released in 1993.

Version 2 (1993) was released as Martin Hash's 3D Animation. The pro version was named Animation:Master.

Version 3 (1994) introduced full 3D inverse kinematics (IK).

Version 4 (1996) added particle effects known as "blobbies". This was the last version to use ".seg" as its primary model format. This was the last version made available in a Unix port. Future versions would be available for Macintosh and Windows.

Version 5 (1997) was a major advance, removing the requirement in previous versions that characters be broken into parts and reassembled in the boning process. It also added numerous skeleton "constraints" which enabled the development of advanced character animation rigs.

Version 9 (2001) Scripting, Expressions

Version 10 (2003) Soft-body Dynamics, Radiosity

Version 11 (2004) SDK (enables 3rd party plug-ins).

Version 12 (2005) Cloth, Layered Rendering into OpenEXR image format.

Version 13 (2006) Hair, Rigid-body Dynamics, File formats now XML based.

Version 14 (2007) Ambient Occlusion (AO), Image-based Lighting (IBL)

Version 15 (2008) Liquids, Baked Materials, Hash Animation:Master Realtime (HA:MR) integration

Version 16 (2011) 64-bit Version, Netrenderer-integration with Multicore-support, 3d connexion device support, OBJ-MDD-Animation-Export, overall performance-boost

Version 17 (2012) Snap to Surface, Animation:Master Answers, SSE4 instruction support, Create your own "Support"-page, deactivated Animate-Mode indicator , Hi-res Simulation

Version 18 (2013/2014) Screen Space Ambient Occlusion render setting, OpenGL3 (and higher), Windows 32bit Direct3D realtime driver removed, GPU-post effects and native support for SAO, Polygon export with additional high subdivision level (up to 4096) especially suited for 3d printing, Polygon mode (OpenGL3 only), GPU Postprocess effects

Version 19 (2017) Save before rendering, bullet physics, SVG importer, Bias Handle Aim at next CP, Birdseye View Queue, Scale to X=0.

== Sources ==
- "Martin Hash's 3D Animation V Reference Manual" ©1997 Hash, Inc.
- "Martin Hash's Animation:Master Reference Guide Revision 98" ©1998 Hash, Inc.
- "Animation:Master '98 Manual Addendum" ©1998 Hash Inc.
- "Martin Hash's Animation:Master Reference Guide" ©2000 Hash, Inc.
- "Animation:Master Technical Reference" online documentation for Animation:Master v11.1 ©2003 Hash, Inc.
- "Animation:Master Technical Reference" online documentation for Animation:Master v12.0 ©2004 Hash, Inc.
- "Animation:Master Technical Reference" online documentation for Animation:Master v13.0 ©2005 Hash, Inc.
- "Technical Reference Martin Hash's Animation:Master" ©2008 Martin D. Hash
- "The Art of Animation:Master" ©2008 Martin D. Hash
