= Swift 3D =

3D graphics software

- Developer(s): Electric Rain
- Stable release: 6.0 / June 2009; 16 years ago
- Operating system: Microsoft Windows, Macintosh
- Type: 3D Graphics for Adobe Flash
- License: Proprietary EULA
- Website: http://www.erain.com/products/swift3d/

Swift 3D is a computer software application program developed by Electric Rain that allows the user to export vector & raster 3d models or import 3D models, animate or manipulate them, and export them for use in Adobe Flash. Swift 3D supports DWG, WMF, EMF & SWF files and can be exported in SWF (Flash) files after basic animations.

Version 5 adds functionality to export to Papervision3D, an application for incorporating 3D into Flash.
