= Showplace =

3D computer graphics

Pixar Showplace
- Original author(s): Pixar
- Developer(s): Pixar
- Initial release: 1992; 33 years ago
- Final release: 2.2 / 1995.12.22; 29 years ago
- Operating system: MacOS System 6, System 7, Windows
- Type: 3D graphics
- License: Pixar EULA
- Website: www.pixar.com

Showplace is a 3D computer graphics program. It was released in the 1990s by Pixar with versions for Apple Macintosh and Microsoft Windows. The Mac version was co-developed by Phil Beffrey and Dana Batali. Version 1.0 sold for US$995. It would create a basic model, from which the user could change model surfaces and set lighting and camera angles. Version 2.0, which cost $495–695, provided additional modeling tools for users called Clip Objects Library and required Pixar's Renderman for rendering images. Users can import models from other software by using RIB-format files.

== Features ==
Version 1.0:

- 42 Clip Object library
- Import objects using RIB format
- Requires 32 bit QuickDraw, math coprocessor
- LabelMaker utility for creating Looks
- Four kinds of lights (ambient, sun, point, spot light)
- Unlimited number of lights
- Background rendering
- Export TIFF and PICT images

Version 1.1

- Upgrade for Mac Quadra 700 and 900
- CD version ($695 US)

Version 2.0 features

- 18 plugins for basic geometry shapes
- Import Adobe Illustrator 3.0+ files, DXF files
- Create 3D type from outline fonts
- Lathe curves while creating 3D objects
- Glimpse
- Professional Look browser
- Three-node version of NetRenderMan
- MacRenderMan standard render

In 1992 Valis group created PrimeRIB object library and PickTure ($345 US) and three shader libraries ($345 US) for Showplace.

It was discontinued when Pixar chose to concentrate on film production instead of application development.

== Universal Scene Description ==
Pixar's Universal Scene Description (USD) software tool included many Showplace features, such as importing models, creating basic models and applying transformations. Transformations include organizing, rotating and scaling models, adding lights, adjusting and changing lighting and changing model materials. USD is designed to work with the modern 3D animation pipeline. Unlike Showplace, Pixar uses USD to create 3D animated movies. USD uses an internal OpenGL renderer. Pixar released an open-source version of Universal Scene Description on 26 July 2016.
