= MojoWorld Generator =

MojoWorld was a commercial, fractal-based modelling program for the creation of digital landscapes, and attracted a following among artists who create space art and science fiction scenes. Originally created by Ken Musgrave, it was marketed commercially by his Pandromeda Inc. company.

== Functionality ==
MojoWorld could generate entire planets through mathematics and procedural generation, using a simple graphical interface and a planet-generation Wizard. The resulting terrain could then be navigated in 3D space much like a videogame, allowing users to easily find exactly the right place for a scenic landscape picture. MojoWorld also allowed the user to edit the landscape and scene, and then have it rendered to an image by the computer.

As well as making still renders of any size, 360-degree views of the planet could also be shared by having the software render a set of 6 x 90-degree tiles covering the entire view. This could be assembled in Quicktime QTVR and shown on the Web. After Quicktime became defunct, tile assemblage was handled by Pano2VR. In 2004 a wholly free MojoWorld 3 Viewer was also released, which enabled anyone to experience, view and render from a saved MojoWorld planet file. Render size for the free Viewer was capped at "1024 x 465 pixels with MojoWorld watermark", and animations could be rendered at "320 x 240 pixels".

The software was supported by a detailed 500-page manual. Users expanded the software's functionality with free plugins, such a volumetrics plugin.

== Versions ==
MojoWorld 3.0 was released in 2004 in Standard and Professional versions, with Pro adding official plugins such as MojoTree (forest generation) and a library of plants and planets. Version 3.1 added native support for .pz3 files created with Poser 6. The final release was MojoWorld 3.1.1 in October 2005, featuring procedural forest generation, boulders, and rocks, and enhanced atmospheres. Many users later migrated to the somewhat similar but more complex E-on Vue landscape software.

MojoWorld 3.1.1 is known to work on Windows 8.1 and 10, and at 2019 a small-but-keen groups of users gather on the Renderosity forum for MojoWorld. There are other users in Russia who keep version 3.1.1 alive, and who can be found via using Russia's Yandex search-engine.

== Notable media usage ==
MojoWorld was used as part of the toolset to create the blockbuster movie The Day After Tomorrow.

MojoWorld was also used to create the planetary backdrops seen in PopCap Games' Bejeweled 2 and Bejeweled Twist.

3D Art Direct magazine interviewed and featured many MojoWorld artists from issue #1 to #32.
