= Bryce (software) =

3D graphics software

- Bryce screenshot
- Developer: Daz 3D
- Release: 1994; 32 years ago
- Stable release: 7.1.0.109 / December 23, 2010; 15 years ago
- Operating system: Windows NT 4 with Service Pack 6 Windows 2000 with Service Pack 2 Windows XP; Windows Vista; Windows 7 Mac OS X Tiger; Mac OS X Leopard Mac OS X Snow Leopard
- Size: 250 MB
- Type: 3D computer graphics
- License: Personal Learning Edition: Freeware; Other editions: Shareware
- Website: daz3d.com/bryce-7-pro

Bryce, also often referred to colloquially as Bryce3D, is a 3D modeling, rendering and animation program specializing in fractal landscapes. The name is taken from Bryce Canyon—a rugged region with many of the same landscapes that were first simulated with the software.

== History ==
The original Bryce software arose from work with fractal geometry to create realistic computer images of mountain ranges and coastlines. An initial set of fractal based programs were developed by Ken Musgrave (who later created MojoWorld), a student of Benoît Mandelbrot, and extended by Eric Wenger. Wenger later met and worked with software artist Kai Krause to design a basic user interface. The first commercial version, Bryce 1.0, appeared in 1994 for the Macintosh.

Bryce 2.0, shipped in 1996, included much beyond the original notion of creating a realistic mountain range. These included independent light sources, complex atmospheric effects, the addition of primitive forms with Boolean methods to combine them, a revamped Texture Editor and the ability to export models to DXF. Bryce 2.0 was also ported to the Windows platform, although the first stable version, 2.1, was not released until 1997.

The ability to animate a scene was added (in a stable form) with the cross-platform Bryce 3D (version 3.1) in 1997 by the newly formed MetaCreations Corporation. A "camera object" unseen in the final image acted as the observer. The camera can be held in one place for a single image, or sent on a trajectory with images being rendered at many locations. The collection of images created along the camera's trajectory are combined to create a realistic animation simulating a journey through a dynamic world.

In 1999 Bryce 4.0 was released with major improvements in the handling of atmospheres and skies, textures and also in the import/export of objects.

In 2000 Bryce was purchased by Corel Corporation. Corel released version 5 of Bryce in 2001, which included several new features, like Tree Lab and metaballs. Unfortunately, rendering on version 5 was much slower than version 4, and the price tag set by Corel higher. Soon followed a patch to version 5.01, which fixed some bugs and added a few undocumented features.

In 2004, the software was sold again, to Daz 3D. In 2005, Daz 3D released Bryce 5.5 which included the Daz Studio Character plugin. This integration between DAZ's application for the manipulation of 3D models, Daz Studio, and Bryce allowed users to import content from Daz Studio and Poser, complete with all materials including transparencies, directly into Bryce, thus making it easier to have human figures in Bryce scenes.

In October 2006, Daz 3D released Bryce 6.0 and has released an update (6.1), this includes a Mac Intel compatible update. New features include animation import, support for dual-processor systems as well as hyper-threading, random replicate tool, advanced terrain editing, HDRI support and other tweaks. The interface remained largely the same, but with a green tint to it, and different buttons in the create palette.

In June 2007, Daz 3D re-released Bryce 5.5 as a freeware.

In Summer 2009, Daz 3D released version 3 of Daz Studio. This version seemed to break Bryce 6.1.

In December 2009, Daz 3D released Bryce 6.3 which improved stability, and added support for Mac OS X v10.6.

Bryce 7 was released in July 2010. New features include the Instancing Lab and advanced lighting. Updated features include the Daz Studio Bridge, the Sky Lab, clouds and HDRI. Bryce 7 is available in three versions, a limited free version, a standard version lacking the new features and a pro version with the new features. Bryce 7 is not currently compatible with OS X Lion (10.7), Mountain Lion (10.8), or Mavericks (10.9) (except for Bryce 7 Personal Limited Edition 7.1.0.74), thus the newest version of OS X it is compatible with is Snow Leopard (10.6).

As late as October 2018, Bryce 7 development was halted, including macOS compatibility issues.

== Features ==
A landscape rendered by Bryce 7

Bryce 7 features:

- Instancing Lab
- Improved Light Lab
- Sky Lab Improvements
- Particle Emitter
- Daz Studio Bridge
- Improved Import/Export file formats

== See also ==
- Autodesk Maya
- Autodesk 3ds Max
- Aladdin4D
- Lightwave 3D
- Electric Image Animation System
- Cinema 4D
- Modo
- Blender
- E-on Vue
- trueSpace
- Softimage 3D
