= Hexagon (software) =

3D graphics software

- Default layout with an empty workspace.
- Developer(s): Daz 3D
- Stable release: 2.5.2.109 / 1 February 2018; 7 years ago
- Written in: C++
- Operating system: Windows 2000 (SP2+); Windows XP or later Mac OS X v10.2 or later
- Type: 3D computer graphics
- License: Proprietary commercial software
- Website: www.daz3d.com/hexagon-2-5-download-version

Hexagon is a subdivision-type 3D modeler owned by Daz 3D. It was originally developed and published by Eovia and was acquired shortly before the release of version 2.0 by Daz 3D in 2006. The software drew heavily on Eovia's other modeler, Amapi (it shared the same developers), though it omitted the NURBs and precision measuring tools. The focus is subdivision modeling, but it includes spline tools and surface tools. Because of the two omissions, it is not as well suited to product design as Amapi, but is aimed more at illustrative and character modeling, with an eye to making it accessible for those new to working in 3D.

Version 2.0 added UV unwrapping tools and a selection of 3D painting tools, though these are still quite basic and do not include layers. Also added was the facility to paint in displacement, or "3D sculpting", which makes Hexagon particularly well suited for organic modeling.

Hexagon continues to be developed under Daz 3D's ownership, with version 2.2 released in June 2007, ver. 2.5 in March 2008, and ver. 2.5.1 in August 2011.

== Workflow ==
Hexagon is strictly a modeler. It does not animate, nor fully render. It is used to create a model, with low resource overhead, before exporting to rendering/rigging/animation software. However, Hexagon can do basic rendering preview within the application, including ambient occlusion.
