= Daz 3D =

3D software company

Daz Productions, Inc.
- Type: Software and Content Developer
- Founded: Utah (2000)
- Headquarters: Salt Lake City, Utah, United States
- Website: daz3d.com

Daz Productions, Inc. (commonly known as Daz 3D, stylized Daz^{3D} or DAZ 3D in certain logos) is a 3D-content and software company, specializing in providing rigged 3D human models, associated accessory content, and software.

== History ==
Originally a part of Zygote Media Group, a general purpose, application-agnostic broker of 3D content, Daz 3D split off as Digital Art Zone in 2000 to focus on supplying content for the Poser market. The company no longer uses that name, and does not treat "Daz" as an acronym for it.

=== Free 3D software ===
In 2012, Daz 3D shifted their strategy from selling 3D software and content to giving the software away for free and focusing more on the selling of the content. This began with offering Daz Studio for free in 2012, which gave customers the ability to render images and videos, and was expanded in 2017 when Daz 3D added Hexagon to the list of their free software products and added the ability to do 3D modelling to that mix.

=== Figure technology ===
In 2011, Daz 3D moved to the Genesis platform, where instead of each figured being designed individually, they were derived as morphs from the base mesh. Two of the key differences that this technology created were: the ability for characters to be blended into a huge variety of shapes; and, since these shapes were all derived from a common base, add-on content like clothing, hair, and additional morphs could both work on all characters and change with the characters.

The Genesis platform has gone through several versions since the launch in 2011. Genesis 9 was released in mid-October 2022.

=== Non-Fungible People ===
In January 2022, Daz 3D minted a NFT collection "Non-Fungible People" featuring 8,888 unique female and non-binary PFP avatars. NFP avatars can be used almost anywhere that supports 3D characters — including those used in real-time — from popular video game engines to AR and streaming software.

== Products ==
Daz 3D has a library of over 5 million assets for Daz Studio and other applications that allow users to create high-quality exportable 3D renders and animations. Daz 3D continues to focus on 3D-content development and has expanded its software offerings by acquiring several notable 3D applications:

- Bryce, a fractal-based landscape modeler and renderer acquired from Corel by Daz 3D in 2004.
- Hexagon, a 3D mesh modeler originally developed by Eovia, acquired by Daz 3D in 2006.
- Carrara, a general purpose 3D modeler/animation package also acquired from Eovia in 2006.

Additionally, Daz 3D developed their own scene creator software, Daz Studio, as an alternative to Poser.

In 2016, Daz 3D spun off Tafi, a 3D-content company intended to focus more on the game developer market.

The Genesis platform allows users to build and render 3D models, characters, and supported assets, such as clothing and accessories. Daz Studio allows users to create and render 3D scenes by manipulating imported assets.

Through the Daz Bridges tool, Daz 3D users can transfer their content to third-party applications, including 3DS Max, Maya, Mudbox, Blender, Cinema 4D, Unity, and Unreal Engine.

Other available Daz Studio features include:

- Realistic 3D character morphing technology
- dForce physics for simulating natural cloth and hair movement
- Backward compatibility for assets created in earlier versions of Genesis
- Filament Viewport and Render Engine for faster rendering time
- Asset and resource manager

== Interface ==
The Daz 3D programs utilize a modular design consisting of panes that enable users to personalize the interface to their preference. When the app launches, users can drag the panes to any location or close them entirely. Panes that have been closed can be reopened by selecting the Panes (Tabs) option from the Window drop-down menu. Additionally, users can customize the layout and design of the interface, from the color scheme to the font.

Resources such as an interactive tutorial, a user guide, and training videos are provided by the software. Daz Marketplace and Wikipedia are also accessible through it.

== Use ==
Adding assets to a scene in Daz 3D typically starts with the Smart Content tab, which lets users access Genesis characters, clothing, accessories, environments, and other ready-made assets. Users may also use their own 3D assets by using Import.

Once the asset appears in the viewport, users can customize it in various ways, such as by altering the figure's pose, its placement in the scene, or the clothing it wears. Additionally, they can add new cameras to provide a distinct perspective on their 3D scene, configure the lighting, and animate the characters before rendering.

Daz 3D software allows for various kinds of 3D content creation, such as sculpting, shading, backgrounds, and others such as:

- Sculpting: Daz 3D Hexagon features include sculpted primitives and freehand modeling brushes, which allow users to sculpt detailed 3D models.
- Shading: Besides conventional 3D scenes, artistic, cartoon-like renders are also possible through Daz 3D's shaders.
- Characters: Daz Studio allows users to create highly configurable 3D character models either from scratch or by importing pre-made or self-created assets.
- Costumes: Using the software, users can also design 3D outfits that have realistic materials, rigging, and real-time movement simulations.
- Backgrounds: Daz 3D software can also be used to create 3D environments for use as backgrounds in 3D scenes.

== Daz Studio ==
Daz Studio is a freeware application developed by Daz 3D to allow users to create 3D scenes and rendering applications that are used to produce images and video. Daz Studio also supports importing and exporting various file formats of 3D objects and animations to use with other 3D content within Daz Studio, as well as to get content out of Daz Studio for use in other 3D applications.
