= VistaPro =

3D scenery generator software

- Developers: Hypercube Engineering, Monkey Byte Development
- Stable release: 4.2 / 2005
- Operating system: AmigaOS, MS-DOS, Windows, MacOS
- Platform: Amiga, IBM PC, Macintosh
- Type: Scenery generator
- License: Proprietary

VistaPro is 3D scenery generator for the Amiga, Macintosh, MS-DOS, and Microsoft Windows. It was written by John Hinkley as the follow-up to the initial version, Vista. The about box describes it as "a 3-D landscape generator and projector capable of accurately displaying real-world and fractal landscapes." It was published by Virtual Reality Labs and developed by Hypercube Engineering. The latest versions were published and developed by Monkey Byte Development.

== Graphics Generation ==
Vista operates similarly to a ray tracer in that light paths are generated. The user specifies light sources, and camera angles. The ground may be colored to create different ground styles. Vista has water, tree and cloud effects, making some images almost photorealistic. The ground itself may either be generated from a random (or user inputted) number, or it may use DEM landscape files for real-world views, the software having come with a number of maps of Mars and Earth.

Vista can load and save output images in PCX, BMP, JPG and Targa file formats. PCX files can also be imported as elevations and ground colors to allow third-party creation of landscapes in other image editors.

Trees can be placed on landscapes as either 2D or 3D objects. In 2D, the trees always face the camera and are fast to generate. 3D trees are created using fractals and can be given a variable bending of the branches to make them look more complicated.

== Releases ==
For Amiga:

- Vista v1.00
- Vista v1.20 (1990, reviewed by Amiga Format issue 15, released on cover disk of Amiga Format issue 33)
- Vista v1.21 (PAL, 1991)
- VistaPro v1.0 (released in 1991)
- VistaPro v1.022 PAL (1991-07-09)
- VistaPro v2.02 (released in 1992)
- VistaPro v3.0 (released in 1993 with AGA support)
- VistaLite v3.01 (version for smaller memory Amiga computers)
- VistaPro v3.3b
- VistaPro v3.04b
- VistaPro v3.05
- VistaPro v3.10o (unreleased)

For MS-DOS and Microsoft Windows:

- VistaPro v1.0 (released in 1992, MS-DOS)
- VistaPro v3.0 (released in 1993, MS-DOS)
- VistaPro v3.05 (released in 1993, MS-DOS)
- VistaPro v3.12 (released in 1994, Windows)
- VistaPro v4.00 (released in 1997)
- VistaPro v4.11
- VistaPro v4.2.4 (released in 2004)
- VistaPro Renderer v4.2 (released in 2004)

For Macintosh:

- VistaPro v1.08 (released in 1991)
- VistaPro v3.00 (1995)
- VistaPro v4.00 (2005)

== Compatibility ==
The Amiga version of Vista works on all models of Amiga, however due to the low processor speeds generation of landscapes take a long time to complete. It was not unusual for a landscape generation to take several hours on a stock 68000 based computer. Later versions, for 32-bit Amigas, support the MC68881/68882 FPU, speeding up rendering considerably when such a chip is present.

The PC version runs in MS-DOS for the earlier versions, and from 4.00 onwards it runs on all versions of 32-bit Microsoft Windows.

== Popular culture ==
Its most famous use was for the landscape used in the opening credits of The Chart Show. This sequence involved a silver spaceship flying through a series of valleys that had been generated using VistaPro (Vista did not support generating animations until the Pro version was released). Vista was also used (both PC and Amiga versions) for the book by Arthur C. Clarke called The Snows of Olympus, a picture book about terraforming Mars. The 1996 PlayStation game Blood Omen: Legacy of Kain uses pre-rendered footage created with VistaPro for the bat flight sequences. The 1994 album Landscapes by Susumu Hirasawa's experimental group Shun was inspired by and used images created in the software.

== See also ==
- Terragen
- E-on Vue
- Picogen
