= OOPARTS =

In Japanese, Ooparts may refer Out-of-place artifact (oopart, OOPArt, OOPart)

== Japanese music ==
- OOPARTS (Shun album), 1994, by Shun
- OOPArts (album), 2009, by the Pillows
- "OOPARTS" (single), 2006, by Hitomi Aizawa
- "OOPArts" (song), from the 2016 Just Bring It (album) by Band-Maid
- "OOPARTS" (song), from the 2022 album Our Hope by Hitsujibungaku
- "Ohayo Ooparts" (song), from the 2010 album Chiffon Capitalism by Sōtaisei Riron
- "ΩΩPARTS" (song), from the 2020 album U.U.F.O. by Camellia (musician)
- "OOPÁRTS" (song), 2025, by NILFRUITS

== Other uses ==
- Ooparts, a Sony PlayStation videogame developer; see List of PlayStation games (A–L)

== See also ==
- Part (disambiguation)
- the art of object oriented programming (OOP arts)
- O-Parts Hunter, Japanese manga comic book about ooparts
- Opart 369 Volleyball Club, Nonthaburi, Thailand
- Oparts, Lori, Armenia
- OpArt, optical art
