= Shun (band) =

Japanese band

- Also known as: 旬; しゅん; Syun
- Origin: Tokyo, Japan
- Genres: Experimental; electronica; ambient; industrial; trance; musique concrète
- Years active: 1984–87; 1994–96
- Labels: Kang-Gung (1984); Model House (1985, 1988); CSV Shibuya (1987); DIW/SYUN (1994–1996)
- Past members: Susumu Hirasawa; Akiro "Kamio" Arishima; Akemi Tsujitani; Iwao Asama; Yuji Matsuda; Teruo Nakano; Hiromi Seki; Shuichi Sugawara; Shigeo Motojima; The oldman, who was on the way to IWATE; Motohiro Yamada; Sacol Trakranprasirt; Supal Kuntatun

Shun (旬; later known as Syun) was a Japanese experimental sampling unit created by Susumu Hirasawa. The group was active from 1983 to 1987, although it was never officially ended, and was revived by Hirasawa in 1994 to 1996.

== History ==
In 1983, Susumu Hirasawa's band P-Model had their Another Game album delayed four months by their label Tokuma Japan Communications, who demanded the group redo the lyrics of the song "Atom-Siberia", claiming they encouraged discrimination. After this, P-Model broke their contract with Tokuma and created the "Another Act" project, where the group would release records with compositions made independently by each member in styles different from P-Model. Hirasawa's releases were made under the name Shun, experimental in nature and featuring heavier use of Hirasawa's homemade sampler, the Heavenizer.

After the fourth Shun album in 1987, the project was put into dormancy until 1994, when Hirasawa re-branded it as Syun, a label to release some of his less commercial works. The same year Syun released Landscapes, an ambient album featuring sounds created by the Vista landscape design software for the Amiga. In 1996, Syun released the Thai-inspired Kun Mae on a Calculation. No more albums were released under the Shun/Syun name after 1996, although Hirasawa continued to use the sounds that originated in Syun albums, most notably in his soundtracks for the adaptations of Berserk and the works of Satoshi Kon.

== Discography ==
Title	Release details
shun (旬) Ⓘ-Location Conditioning Cycle	Released: February 1984; Label: Kang-Gung Records; Formats: 33 RPM Record
SHUN 2nd (旬 II) 1778–1985	Released: April 1985; Label: MODEL HOUSE; Formats: 33 RPM Record
SHUN (旬) IIIrd SHEETS (TABLE BEAT) P-MODEL ANOTHER ACT 4	Released: May 1985; Label: MODEL HOUSE; Formats: 33 RPM Record
SHUN・4 SHUN	Released: 25 October 1987; Label: CSV Shibuya; Formats: 33 RPM Record
SHUN・4 VISION (旬IV VISION)	Released: April 1988 30 November 1995 (Reissue); Label: MODEL HOUSE DIW, SYUN (Reissue); Formats: VHS
OOPARTS OUT OF PLACE ARTIFACTS	Released: 25 May 1994; Label: DIW, SYUN; Formats: CD
Landscapes	Released: 22 October 1994; Label: DIW, SYUN; Formats: CD
Kun Mae on a Calculation (計算上のKun Mae, Keisanjō no Kun Mae)	Released: 29 February 1996; Label: DIW, SYUN; Formats: CD

== Members ==
- Susumu Hirasawa – All releases
- Akiro "Kamio" Arishima – shun and Landscapes
- Akemi Tsujitani – shun
- Iwao Asama – shun
- Yuji Matsuda – SHUN 2nd, SHUN IIIrd SHEETS and SHUN・4
- Teruo Nakano – SHUN 2nd
- Hiromi Seki – SHUN・4
- Shuichi Sugawara – SHUN・4
- Shigeo Motojima – SHUN・4
- The oldman, who was on the way to IWATE. – SHUN・4
- Motohiro Yamada – Landscapes
- Sacol Trakranprasirt – Kun Mae on a Calculation
- Supat Kuntatun – Kun Mae on a Calculation
- Yūichi Hirasawa – SHUN・4 VISION (except SHUN・II)
- Hiroshi Moriguchi – SHUN・4 VISION (SHUN・II only)
- Kiyoshi Inagaki – SHUN・4 VISION ("GRAPHIX")
