= Don Fussell =

American computer scientist

Don Fussell is an American computer scientist. He was Trammell Crow Regents Professor at the University of Texas at Austin.
