= Terragen =

Scenery generator software

- Terragen 2.0.1.1
- Original author: Matt Fairclough
- Developer: Planetside Software
- Stable release: 4.5.56 / January 1, 2021; 5 years ago
- Written in: C++
- Operating system: Windows, Mac OS X
- Type: 3D computer graphics
- License: Commercial, freeware
- Website: planetside.co.uk

Terragen is a scenery generator program for Microsoft Windows and Mac OS X developed and published by Planetside Software. It can be used to create renderings and animations of landscapes.

== History ==
Terragen Classic
- Original author: Matt Fairclough
- Developer: Planetside Software
- Stable release: 0.9.43 / September 7, 2005
- Preview release: 1.9.99.1 / July 31, 2008
- Operating system: Microsoft Windows, Mac OS X
- Type: 3D computer graphics
- License: Commercial, Freeware
- Website: Terragen Classic for Windows; Terragen Classic for Mac

Released in stages (tech preview and beta) to a participating community, Terragen 2 was released to pre-purchasers on 2 April 2009. Terragen 2 is offered in feature limited freeware and full-featured commercial licenses.

Planetside Software released the first public version of Terragen 2 after more than three years of development of both the core technologies and the program itself. Since then there have been several released updates to both licenses of the software along the development cycle with a series of technology previews and a beta release. The "final" build was released on April 23, 2009, and more updates, including feature modules, are expected to be released later.

Planetside released Terragen 3 in August 2013. Version 3.1 was released in February 2014. Version 4 was released in 2016.

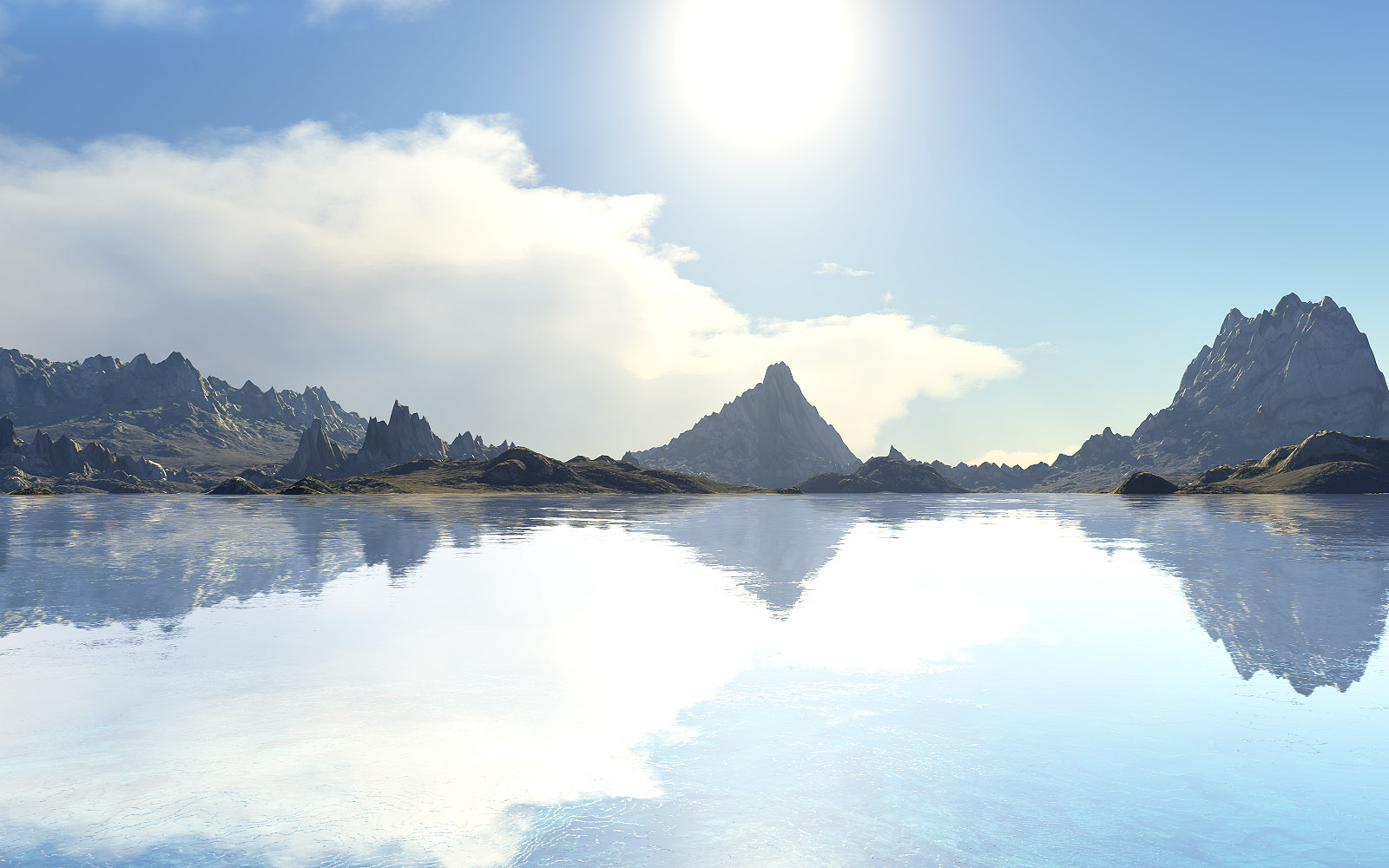
A highly reflective lake, showing off the possibility for photorealistic renders in Terragen Classic

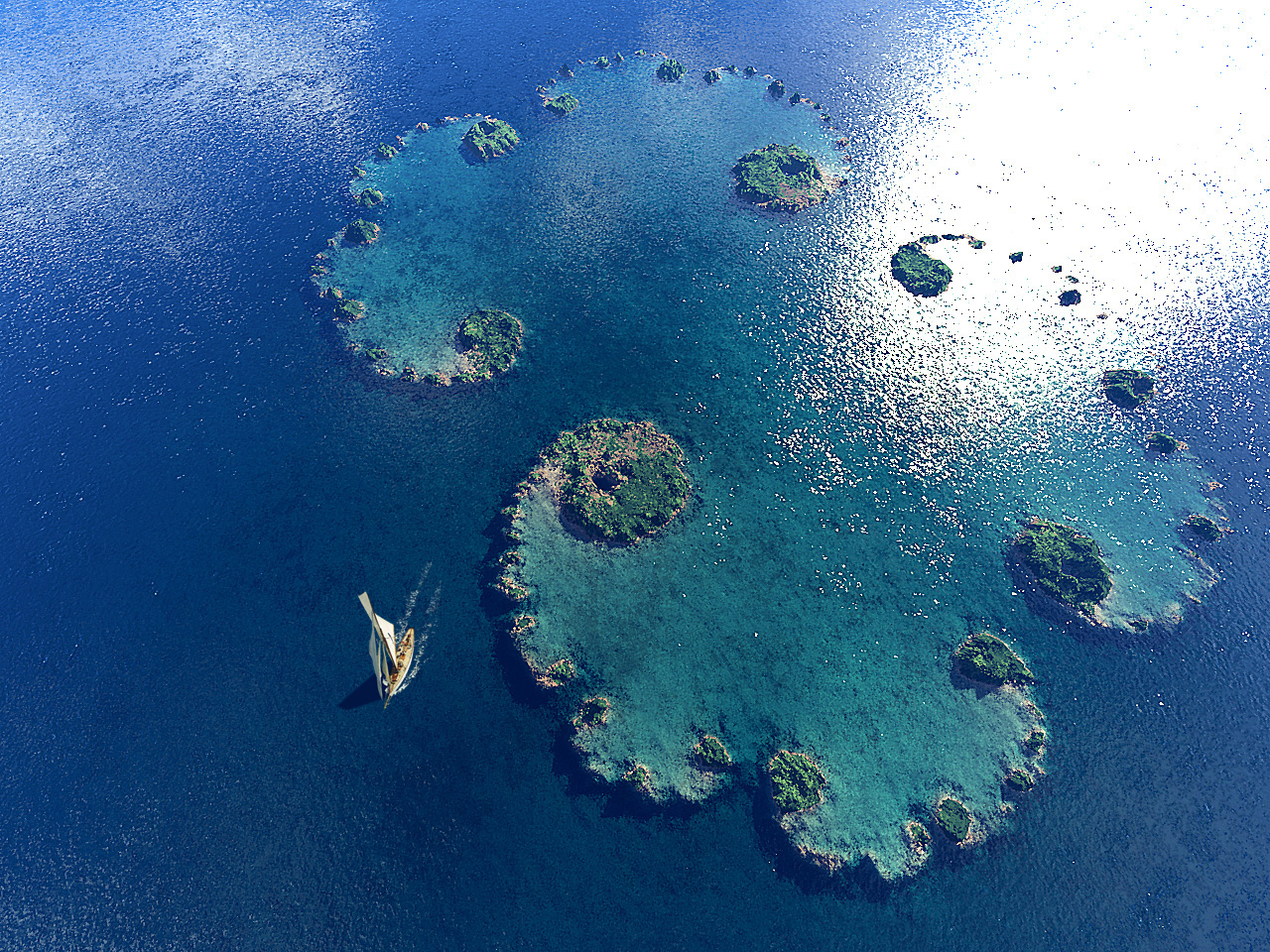
Julia island from Terragen Classic. It can be combined with other tools (here land-mapping as a Julia set).

== Terragen Classic ==
Terragen Classic is popular among amateur artists, which can be attributed to it being freeware, its intuitive interface, and its capability to create photorealistic landscapes when used skillfully. It can also use DEM (digital elevation model) files, and other graphic surface maps for rendering.

A commercial version of the software is also available and is capable of creating larger terrains, renders with higher image resolution, larger terrain files, and better post-render anti-aliasing than the freeware version.

The terrain is generated from a two-dimensional heightmap. The program contains facilities for importing and exporting heightmaps to images, for use in other programs.

== Use in media ==
Rendering software contributed by PlanetSide proprietor Matt Fairclough was used by Digital Domain for effects in Star Trek Nemesis. Terragen Classic was used in The Golden Compass, the 2006 remake of The Wicker Man, games, and many TV commercials.

An image from what is now known as Terragen Classic appeared on the April 16, 2001, cover of Newsweek, and Terragen was used for animations in Brandy Norwood's "What About Us?" music video. The classic version was also used by numerous artists, such as Joan Fontcuberta ("Orogenesis" series), and the French photographer Mathieu Bernard-Reymond ("Vous êtes ici" series and "Pôle" series). Terragen Classic was used to create skyboxes for 3D video games such as Serious Sam.

The software was used by Devastudios to create the mountainous scenery in the intro used by Paramount Pictures for its centennial anniversary in 2012, alongside Autodesk Maya, with Mission: Impossible – Ghost Protocol in 2011, which would be carried on for Paramount Players, Paramount Television Studios, Paramount Animation (under supervision of Reel FX and ATK PLN), Paramount+ and their parent company, Paramount Global (now known as Paramount Skydance Corporation), with the latter two being done by Loyalkaspar and Bigstar, based on their work. Devastudios also used the software for the sky and clouds in the 2021 and 2023 Warner Bros. Pictures logos with Locked Down and Wonka, respectively, alongside the Academy Color Encoding System (ACES) and Adobe Substance 3D Painter for the latter, which would later be carried on for Warner Bros. Television, New Line Cinema and Warner Bros. Pictures Animation.

== See also ==
- E-on Vue
- VistaPro
- Picogen
