= Plasma effect =

Computer-based visual effect

The plasma effect is a computer-based visual effect animated in real-time. It uses cycles of changing colours warped in various ways to give an illusion of liquid, organic movement.

The plasma effect involves manipulating color values over time and space, often using a gradient color palette that shifts to produce a dynamic, animated visual. By combining several sine waves across the x and y axes, the effect achieves a smooth and continuous look. In some implementations, color palettes are used to shift the hue of the entire effect, creating a flowing and vibrant motion.

This effect can be achieved programmatically by generating pixel values based on mathematical formulas. It is a popular technique in shaders and graphical effects to create visually appealing animations.

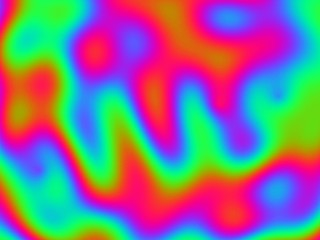
A still screenshot of a typical plasma effect.

Animated color cycling feature as in Fractint

Plasma is the name of a VGA graphics demo created by Bret Mulvey in 1988 and released on CompuServe. It uses a diamond-square algorithm to generate a 2D pattern, and then cycles the colors using hardware palette in its 256-color mode.

Plasma was picked up by demo coders for their demos where the effect was heavily used, especially in the early 1990s. The effect was particularly common on the Amiga where it could be implemented very efficiently with its display hardware features. Plasma can also be implemented easily in software rendering by using sinus tables and pseudocolor palettes, and it has also been the first true demo effect for many beginning PC democoders.

The fractal software Fractint also incorporates an algorithm known as "plasma", which, when combined with the color cycling feature of the software, can provide a result which resembles a typical plasma effect used in demos. The technical basis, however, is completely different, and a color cycling plasma is somewhat less dynamic than a demo plasma.

Similar effects can be implemented on modern GPUs using pixel shaders.

== Synopsis ==
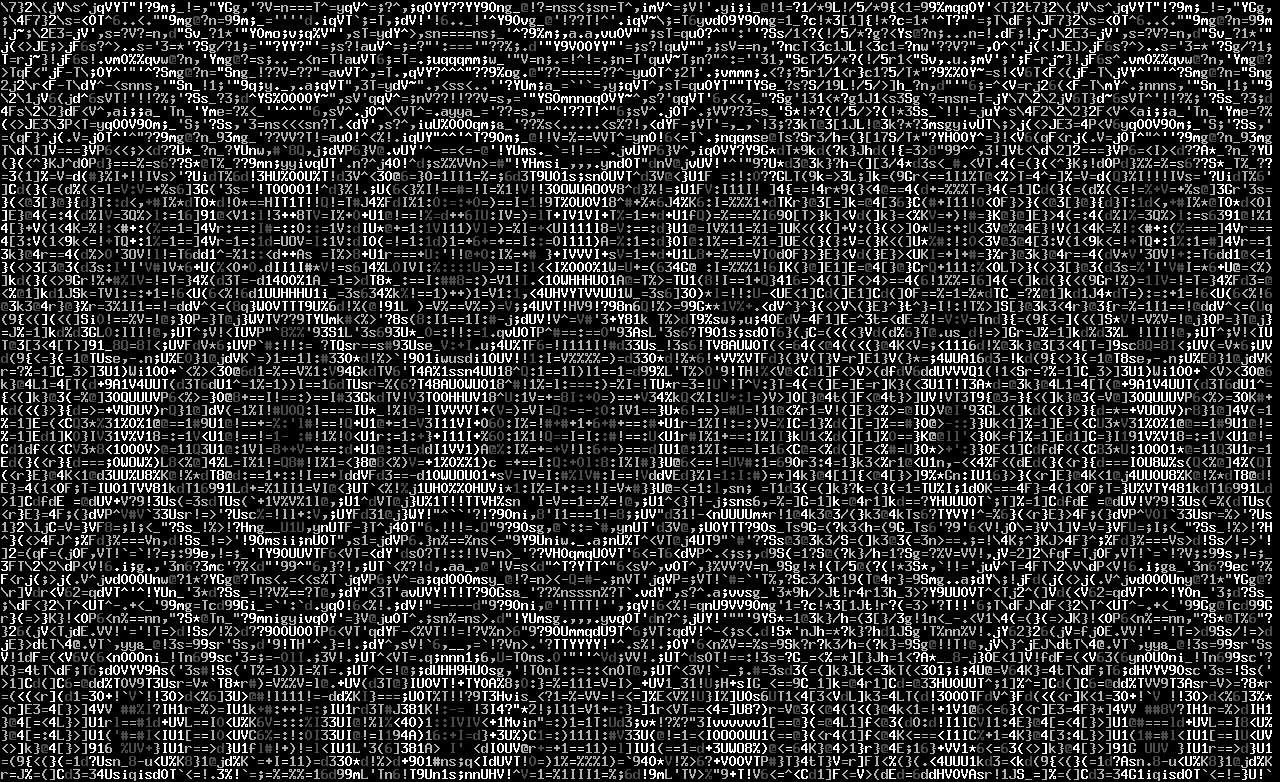
A plasma effect rendered in ANSI art by the AAlib library.

As there are many "hacked" approaches for implementing a plasma effect, this outline of an algorithm will just describe the theoretical basis for the effect. In order to achieve a sufficiently fast and good-looking real-time implementation (especially on the limited hardware available at the time this effect was at the height of its popularity in the 1990s), one would often do "non-correct" approximations to this algorithm. This, however, can often be done without noticeable visual differences.

This algorithm is given in two dimensions, but could easily be adopted to any number of dimensions or any number of color channels.

Let $f(x, y)$ be a multi-frequency noise function of two variables (e.g., a Perlin noise function). Let each color component $c$ at the pixel $(x, y)$ be a linear function of the expression $\sin(f(x,y) * \text{freq}_c)$. Increasing the value of the constant $\text{freq}_c$ tends to increase the steepness of the color gradients in the image.

== See also ==
Diamond-square algorithm is the fractal used by the original Plasma demo, and is now often called the plasma fractal which was the name given to it in Fractint.
