= OOPARTS (Shun album) =

Compilation album by Shun
- Released: May 25, 1994
- Recorded: 1984–1987; AC UNIT STUDIO (SHUN IIIrd SHEETS); United States Of KAMEARI (SHUN・4)
- Genre: Experimental, electronic, ambient, psychedelic, industrial, trance, musique concrète
- Length: 43:21
- Label: DIW, Shun
- Producer: Shun, Susumu Hirasawa

Shun chronology
SHUN・4 VISION (1988)	OOPARTS (1994)	Landscapes (1994)

OOPARTS is a compilation album by the Japanese experimental music group Shun, released on DIW Records in 1994. The title of the album references out-of-place artifacts.

== Overview ==
OOPARTS includes every song released by Shun over its four-year period of activity. It features heavy use of sampling.

Shun's composer Susumu Hirasawa remarked in the album's liner notes that the music did not age well, citing a loss of its original uniqueness and shock value.

== Track listing ==
No.	Title	Writer(s)	Originally from	Length
1.	"Ⓘ-Location"	Susumu Hirasawa, Akiro "Kamio" Arishima, Akemi Tsujitani, Iwao Asama	shun, 1984	4:51
2.	"Conditioning Cycle"	Hirasawa, "Kamio", Tsujitani, Asama	shun, 1984	5:05
3.	"1778-1985"	Hirasawa, Yuji Matsuda, Teruo Nakano	SHUN 2nd, 1985	5:41
4.	"TABLE BEAT [response version]"	Hirasawa, Matsuda	SHUN IIIrd SHEETS, 1985	4:47
5.	"TABLE BEAT [paradime version]"	Hirasawa, Matsuda	SHUN IIIrd SHEETS, 1985	4:39
6.	"LOCATION"	Hirasawa, Hiromi Seki, Shuichi Sugawara, Shigeo Motojima, Matsuda, The oldman, who was on the way to IWATE.	SHUN・4, 1987	4:08
7.	"SIPHON"	Hirasawa, Seki, Sugawara, Motojima, Matsuda, oldman	SHUN・4, 1987	6:00
8.	"SHUN II"	Hirasawa, Seki, Sugawara, Motojima, Matsuda, oldman	SHUN・4, 1987	4:35
9.	"PAE"	Hirasawa, Seki, Sugawara, Motojima, Matsuda, oldman	SHUN・4, 1987	3:34

== Personnel ==
- Susumu Hirasawa – shun (Vocals, HEAVENIZER), SHUN 2nd, SHUN IIIrd SHEETS (Drums, Acoustic guitar, Electric Guitar Bass, Keyboard, Voice, Effects, Noise) and SHUN・4
- Akiro "Kamio" Arishima – shun (Tapes, Percussion)
- Akemi Tsujitani – shun (Vocals, Synthesizer)
- Iwao Asama – shun (Atmosphere)
- Yuji Matsuda – SHUN 2nd, SHUN IIIrd SHEETS (Rhythm Adjustment, Electric Bass Guitar, Keyboard, Main Vocals, Effects) and SHUN・4
- Teruo Nakano – SHUN 2nd
- Hiromi Seki – SHUN・4
- Shuichi Sugawara – SHUN・4
- Shigeo Motojima – SHUN・4
- The oldman, who was on the way to IWATE. – SHUN・4
- Boris Karloff and O.P. Heggie – sampled acting in "Conditioning Cycle"
- Domenico Ghirlandaio – cover art (Saint Jerome in His Study)
