= Outerra =

Slovak computer software company

Outerra s.r.o
- Type: Private
- Industry: Information Technology
- Founded: 2010
- Headquarters: Bratislava, Slovakia
- Website: outerra.com

Outerra s.r.o is a Slovak computer software company best known for its middleware 3D planetary graphics engine, called Outerra engine, in development since 2008. The engine renders high-quality terrain, terrain texturing, flora and water flow normal maps using relatively sparse and highly compressed data through fractal processing and other types of procedural generation. The game Anteworld uses real world data to create a virtual replica of planet Earth.

== Features ==
Features of the engine and its tech-demo Anteworld include:

An example of how Outerra relies on fractal calculations for terrain rendering

- Fractal refinement of preexisting terrain data
- Support of vector-based data, such as roads
- Seamless transitioning from outer space to planet surface
- Chromium browser integration
- Land vehicle physics and JSBSim flight dynamics model library for aircraft physics
- Unlimited visibility
- Dynamic and adjustable time flow
- FreeTrack support
- FBX importer and export of models in self-installing OTX format
- Oculus Rift support

== Anteworld ==
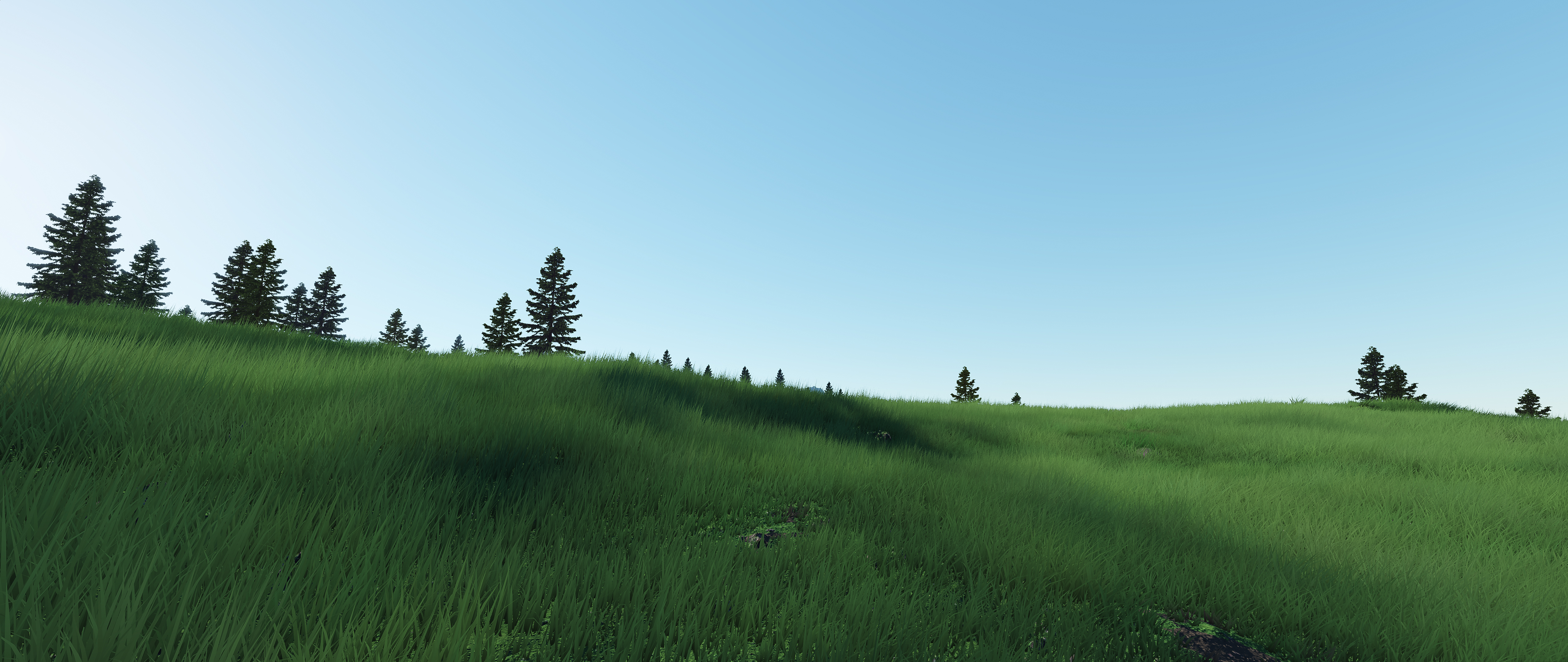
A landscape from the Outerra Anteworld engine

The developers of Outerra in 2012 released an alpha tech-demo for the engine called Anteworld (the name comes from the Latin prefix Ante-, meaning prior-to in time - "A world that was") that consists of a digital replica of the whole planet Earth at a 1:1 scale. The virtual world can be explored in a free-camera mode as well as in vehicles such as planes, boats and cars. It also features a first person walking mode. For the mirror world real world data was used - ingame the user can blend in an embedded Google Maps of real Earth that is synchronized with the current camera position. Since June 2013 Anteworld provides support for Oculus Rift. Furthermore, user-made objects such as houses and vehicles can be spawned and used in the sandbox game. While the tech-demo is free some features require an upgrade to the $15 full version. An accompanying novella that is loosely tied to the game written by C. Shawn Smith is planned as well.

Returning aboard an interstellar colonizer ship built in the Golden Age of Mankind, players arrive on the planet earth to discover civilization and humanity vanished. They will have to rebuild the civilization - exploring, fighting, and competing for resources while searching for clues to the disappearance of humanity. The game will contain several modes, the basic one will be a single-player game but with player-built locations being synchronized and replicated between clients. That means player can settle in a free location of his choice where he can build and play, and when he goes exploring he'll be able to observe and visit other sites where other players are building their world.

— Brano Kemen, Developer of Outerra on the plans for the game

== Middle-Earth DEM Project ==
In 2013 a separate non-profit motivated group of hobbyists released a first version of terrain data of Middle-Earth compiled for Outerra. The goal of this digital elevation model project, which was launched by Oshyan Greene and Carl Lingard in 2006, is what they summarize as a "living, breathing Middle Earth" - a highly detailed model which includes rivers, vegetation, buildings, roads and subterranean features. The sources for the maps include Tolkien's maps (such as the ones in The Lord of the Rings and The Silmarillion), Strachey's Journeys of Frodo, Fonstad's The Atlas of Middle-earth, the locations used in Peter Jackson's movies as well as fan made maps.

== Virtual Mars ==
In February 2014 the developers announced ongoing development, which was planned since October 2009, to add another planet to the two already existing ones (Earth and the fictional Middle-Earth) – Mars. Additionally in 2014 they stated that "ultimately the whole solar system should be accessible" in a single game on Twitter.

== TitanIM ==
TitanIM (Titan Integrated Military) is an Outerra-based military simulation platform that was revealed in December 2014 at the world's largest modeling, simulation and training conference oriented at military use, I/ITSEC in Orlando. TitanIM was granted exclusive license to the Outerra engine for military use. The initial public release version of the software is known as Titan Vanguard.

== Microprose ==
In 2022, the Outerra game engine was acquired by Microprose, with the aim of finishing and publishing the game after more than 15 years of development, and publish the game both as a sandbox and as the game engine for microprose.
