= E-on Vue =

3D landscape generation software

Vue
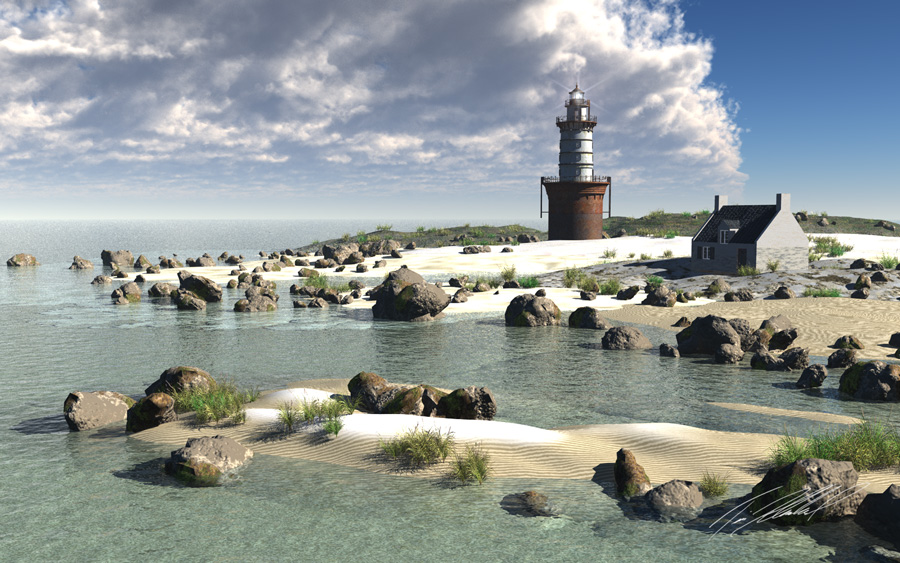
- Vue landscape example
- Developer: Bentley Systems
- Initial release: November 8, 1997; 28 years ago
- Final release: 2023 / January 11, 2023; 2 years ago
- Operating system: Windows, macOS
- Type: 3D computer graphics
- License: Proprietary
- Website: bentley.com/software/e-on-software-free-downloads

Vue is a software tool for world generation by Bentley Systems, with support for many visual effects, animations, and various other features. The tool has been used in several feature-length films.

In 2024, Bentley Systems announced that Vue would be discontinued, and be freely available to those that still wish to use it.

== Versions ==
VUE	PlantFactory
VUE 2016 / VUE 2015 / VUE 2014 / VUE 11	PlantFactory 2016 / PlantFactory 2015 / PlantFactory 2014
CloudFactory - Ozone	Carbon Scatter
CloudFactory 2017 / CloudFactory 2015 / Ozone 6 / Ozone 5	Carbon Scatter 2017 / Carbon Scatter 2015 / Carbon Scatter 2 / Carbon Scatter

== Features ==
This is a list of features as of the 2023 release of Vue:

=== Terrains ===
- Heightfield terrains
- Procedural terrains
- Infinite terrains
- Planetary terrains
- Real-world terrains
- 3D terrain sculpting
- Terrain export

=== EcoSystem Instancing Technology ===
- Material-based EcoSystems
- Global EcoSystems
- Dynamic EcoSystems
- 360° EcoSystem Population
- Paint EcoSystem instances
- EcoParticles
- Export EcoSystem populations

=== Vegetation ===
- Built-in Plant editor
- Compatible with PlantFactory
- Vegetation assets

=== Atmosphere, Skies and Clouds ===
- Standard atmospheric model
- Spectral atmospheric model
- Photometric atmospheric model
- Atmosphere presets
- Procedural Volumetric 3D cloud layers
- Standalone 3D Metaclouds
- Convert meshes to Clouds
- Cloud morphing
- Import OpenVDB
- Export standalone and cloud layer zones to OpenVDB
- Export skies as HDRI

=== Modeling ===
- Primitive and Feature modeling
- 3D Text edition tool
- Metablobbing
- Hyperblobs
- Export baked hyperblobs
- Splines
- Built in Road Construction toolkit
- Random rock generator
- Export rocks

=== Texturing and UVs ===
- Material presets
- PBR
- Substance support
- Node-based procedural materials
- Volumetric materials and Hypertextures
- Stacked UVs
- Unwrapped UVs
- Ptex

=== Interoperability, Integration And Export ===
- Export single assets to generic 3D formats
- Full scene export
- Integration plugins
- Import and Export Camera data as FBX and Nuke.chan
- Python API
- ZBrush GoZ bridge

=== Animation ===
- Animate objects, materials, atmospheres, clouds, waves...
- Automatic wind and breeze
- Localized wind effects per plant / per EcoSystem population
- Omni and directional ventilators for local modifications of plants
- Time spline editor
- Automatic keyframe creation
- Automatic synchronization of cameras and lights
- Animation export as AfterEffects
- Import motion tracking information

=== Lighting ===
- Global illumination, Global Radiosity, Ambient occlusion
- Subsurface Scattering
- HDRI image based lighting
- Point light, Quadratic point light, Spotlight, Quadratic spotlight, Directional light
- Use IES distribution profiles on photometric lights
- Area lights, light panels, light portals
- Physically accurate caustics computation

=== Rendering ===
- Render with Ray Tracer
- Render with Path Tracer
- Stereoscopic rendering
- 360/180 VR Panorama Render Option
- Spherical panoramic rendering
- Tone mapping options
- Multipass & G-Buffer
- Network rendering with HyperVue / RenderCows
- Network rendering with RenderNodes

== Users ==
- Blue Sky Studios
- Digital Domain
- DreamWorks Animation: Kung Fu Panda
- Industrial Light & Magic: Indiana Jones and the Kingdom of the Crystal Skull, Pirates of the Caribbean: Dead Man's Chest
- Sony Pictures Imageworks
- Warner Bros. Interactive Entertainment
- Weta Digital

== See also ==
- Blender
- Cinema 4D
- 3dsmax
- Maya
- Unity 3D
- Unreal
- Daz
- Photoshop
- Lightwave 3D
- Modo
- Substance
- Bryce
