= Picogen =

Artificial terrain rendering software

picogen

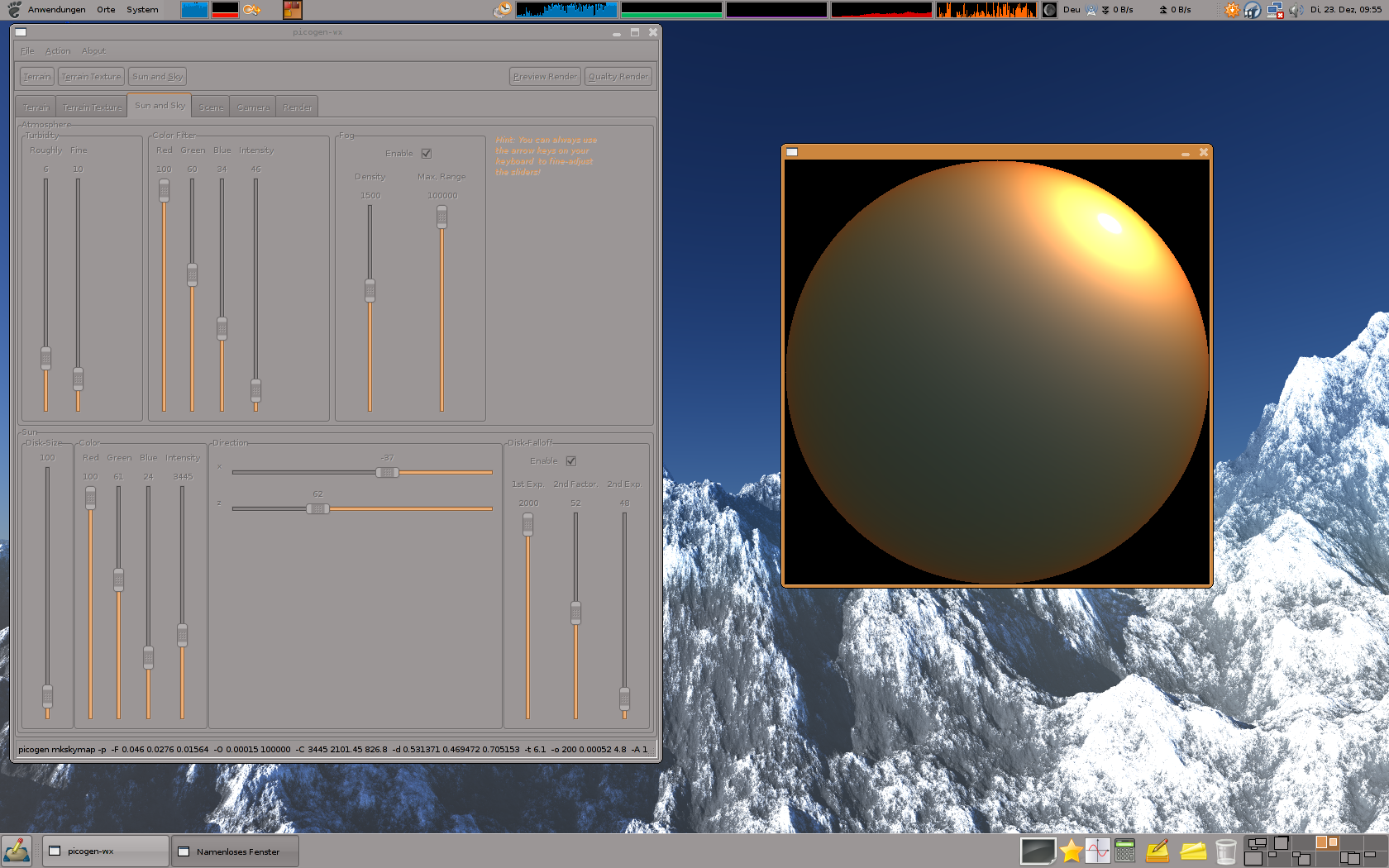
- Developer(s): Sebastian Mach
- Stable release: 0.3 / July 20, 2010; 14 years ago
- Repository: git.sv.gnu.org/picogen.git
- Written in: C++
- Operating system: Linux, Windows
- Platform: Cross-platform
- Type: Scenery generator
- License: GPL, Version 3, or newer
- Website: picogen.org

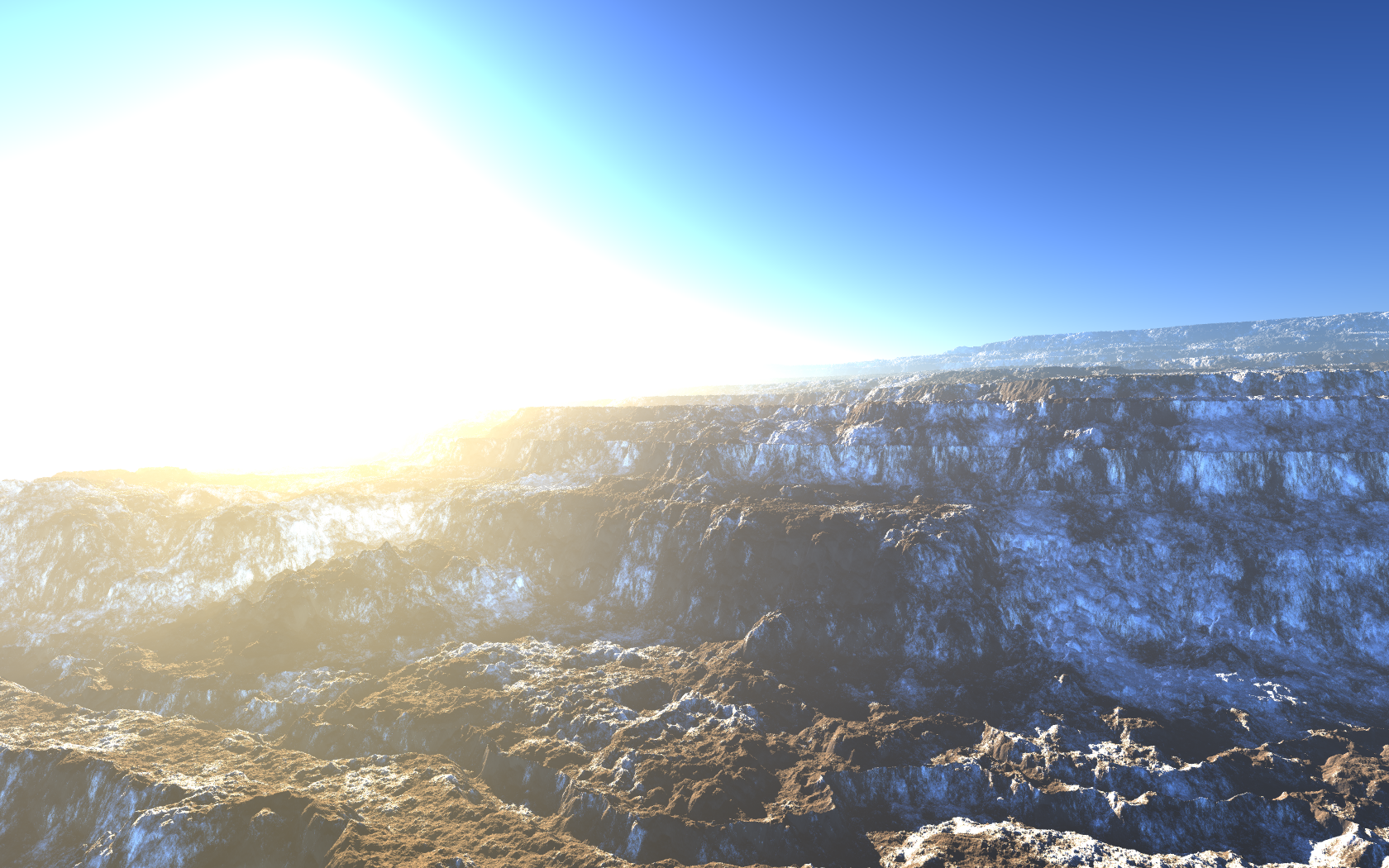
A canyon landscape with snow-like shader

An alpine landscape

Picogen is a rendering system for the creation and rendering of artificial terrain, based on ray tracing. It is free software.

== Overview ==
While the primary purpose of picogen is to display realistic 3D terrain, both in terms of terrain formation and image plausibility, it also is a heightmap-creation tool, in which heightmaps are programmed in a syntax reminiscent of Lisp.

The shading system is partially programmable.

== Example features ==
- Whitted-Style ray tracer for quick previews
- Rudimentary path tracer for high quality results
- Partial implementation of Preetham's Sun-/Skylight Model
- Procedural heightmaps, though before rendering they are tesselated

== Frontends ==
Currently there is a frontend to picogen, called picogen-wx (based on wxWidgets). It is encapsulated from picogen and thus communicates with it on command-line level. Picogen-wx provides several panels to design the different aspects of a landscape, e.g. the Sun/Sky- or the Terrain-Texture-Panel. Each panel has its own preview window, though each preview window can be reached from any other panel.

Landscapes can be loaded and saved through an own, simple XML-based file format, and images of arbitrary size (including antialiasing) can be saved.

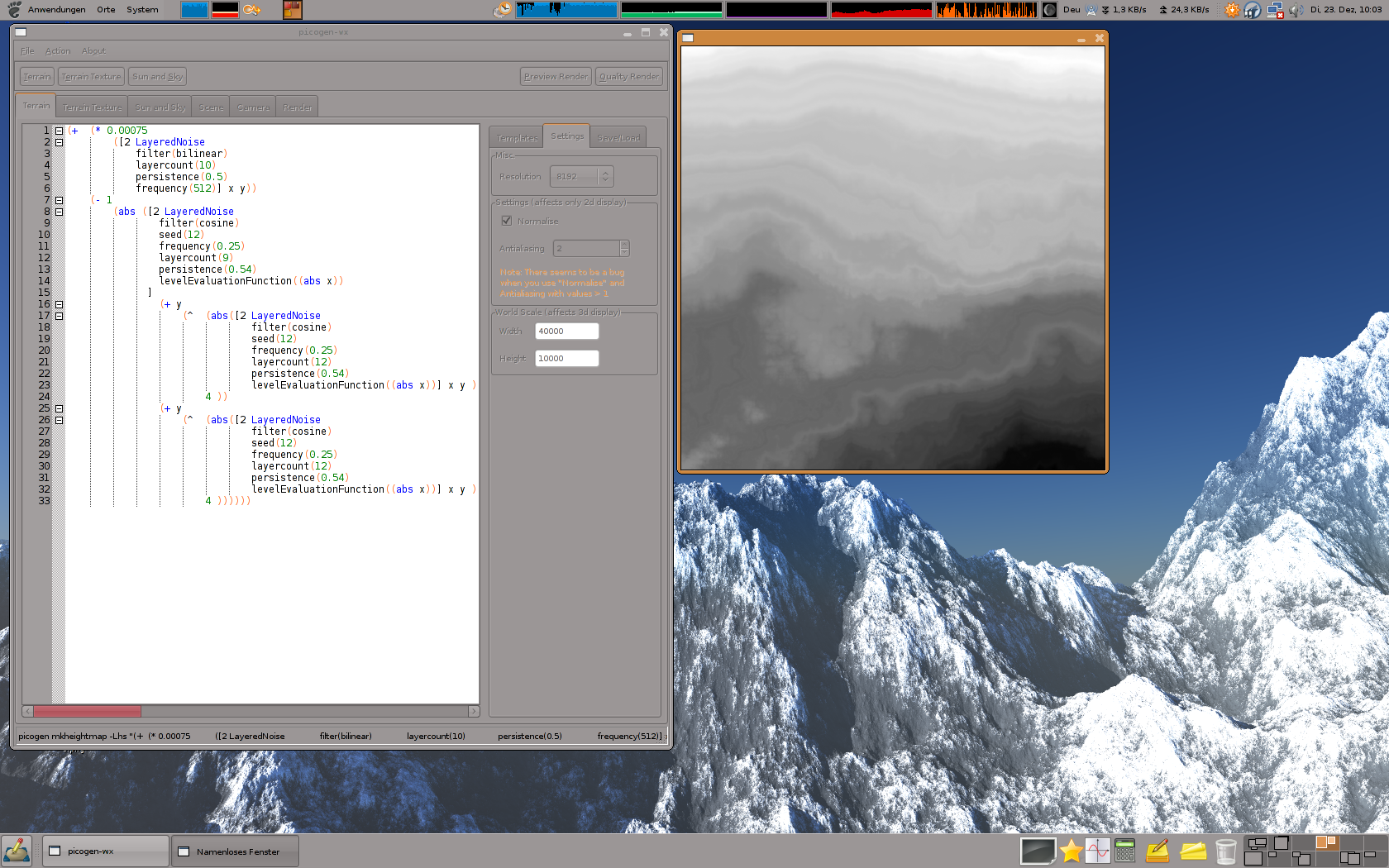
The heightmap panel
