= John Berton =

American animator

John Andrew Berton Jr. is an American computer graphics animator and visual effects supervisor. His most recent completed project is Bedtime Stories. He also worked in India, supervising effects on the film Krrish 3. In the fall of 2013, he joined the faculty of Drexel University in Philadelphia.

== Education and early career ==
Berton holds a B.A. in Communications and Film from Denison University, where he was also a writer-performer for a small radio comedy troupe called Pith. After a brief stint as a disc jockey, he joined the acclaimed Computer Graphics Research Group (CGRG) computer graphics program at Ohio State University, later known as ACCAD (The Advanced Computing Center for the Arts and Design). There he earned an M.A. in Art Education/Computer Graphics. This led to artistic and experimental work at Cranston/Csuri Productions, an Ohio-based early CG company founded in 1981.

In 1986 Berton joined Mental Images, a software company that also had a production division to help develop their renderer. Together with Rolf Herken, Axel Dirksen, Hans-Christian Hege, Robert Hödicke, Wolfgang Krüger, Ulrich Weinberg and Roger Wilson, he created an animated film (also called mental images) that was well received at SIGGRAPH, NICOGRAPH and Prix Ars Electronica.

== ILM work ==
Many of Berton's best known films were made during his tenure at Industrial Light and Magic, which began in 1990. These include Terminator 2: Judgment Day (1991) and Star Trek VI: The Undiscovered Country (also 1991), The Mummy (1999), and Men in Black II (2002), among others. By 1992 he was a CG department manager, by 1997 a digital effects supervisor, and in 1998 a visual effects supervisor. Many of the films on which Berton worked have received awards and nominations in visual effects categories, including the 1991 Academy Award for Best Visual Effects for Terminator 2: Judgment Day, the 1993 Academy Award for Best Visual Effects for Jurassic Park. Berton's last film for ILM was Men in Black II, in which he also had a cameo role as an alien postal worker. He has also appeared as himself in several programs and featurettes about computer graphics.

== Independent work ==
Since leaving ILM, Berton has been digital effects supervisor on I, Robot (2004) and visual effects supervisor on the 2006 film Charlotte's Web. Producer Jordan Kerner explains that Berton was hired for Charlotte's Web because the filmmakers needed someone "who had been involved with field that had a tremendous amount of fully 3-D, computer-generated characters who have to convey thoughts and emotions." The film's visual effects were produced by five different companies, but it was Berton, according to Kerner, who "drew those elements together." After Charlotte's Web Berton worked with Director/Screenwriter David Goyer on a proposed stereographic thriller for Walt Disney Pictures, followed by supervising the visual effects on Bedtime Stories, also for Walt Disney Pictures. This film, directed by Adam Shankman, stars Adam Sandler and Keri Russell and was released at Christmas 2008. In August, 2011, Berton traveled to India for a two-year stint as Visual Effects Supervisor on Krrish 3, a sequel to the 2006 Bollywood film Krrish.

== Awards ==
Berton's personal awards include the Monitor Award for Best Computer Graphics Animation on the 1984 Super Bowl, the Nicograph Grand Prize for Computer Animation for the short film Snoot and Muttly, and an Honorable Mention from Prix Ars Electronica for Mental Images. He was twice a finalist for nomination for the Academy Award for Best Visual Effects, in 1999 for The Mummy (1999) and in 2002 for Men in Black II. He was nominated for Best Visual Effects by the British Academy for Film and Television Arts (BAFTA) for The Mummy in 1999. In 2006 he was nominated for Best Visual Effects by the Visual Effects Society for Charlotte's Web (2006).

== Personal ==
The University of Hawaiʻi at Manoa welcomed John Berton into their teaching staff for the Academy of Creative Media, in fall of 2012.
