= Avizo =

Avizo may refer to:

- Avizo (software), 3D visualization and analysis software
- Avizo (magazine), Slovakia's daily advertising magazine, published by Northcliffe Media
