= Amira (software) =

Software platform for 3D and 4D data visualization

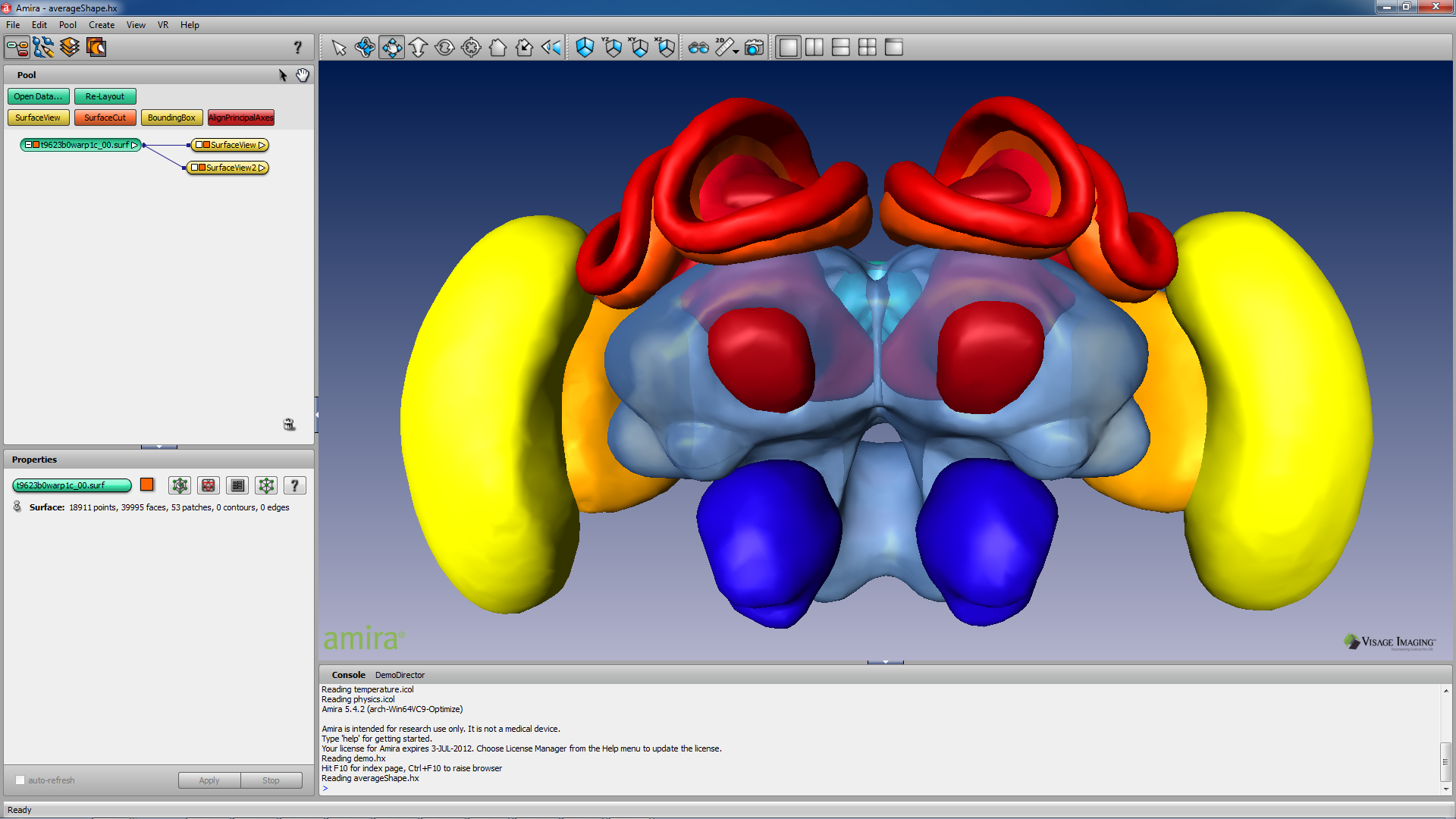
- Screenshot of Amira window
- Developers: Zuse Institute Berlin; Thermo Fisher Scientific
- Release: October 1999; 26 years ago
- Stable release: 2020.3 / February 2021; 5 years ago
- Written in: Python 3.5
- Operating system: Windows XP SP3, Windows Vista, Windows 7 OS X 10.5, OS X 10.6, OS X 10.7; RHEL 5.5
- Platform: IA-32, x64
- Available in: English
- Type: 3D data visualization and processing
- License: Trialware
- Website: thermofisher.com/amira-avizo

Amira (ah-MEER-ah) is a software platform for visualization, processing, and analysis of 3D and 4D data. It is being actively developed by Thermo Fisher Scientific in collaboration with the Zuse Institute Berlin (ZIB), and commercially distributed by Thermo Fisher Scientific — together with its sister software Avizo.

== Overview ==
Amira is an extendable software system for scientific visualization, data analysis, and presentation of 3D and 4D data. It is used by researchers and engineers in academia and industry. It is a tool for processing, analysis and visualization of data from various modalities; e.g. micro-CT, PET, Ultrasound. It is used in many fields, such as microscopy in biology and materials science, molecular biology, quantum physics, astrophysics, computational fluid dynamics (CFD), finite element modeling (FEM), non-destructive testing (NDT), and many more. One of the key features, besides data visualization, is Amira's set of tools for image segmentation and geometry reconstruction. This allows the user to mark (or segment) structures and regions of interest in 3D image volumes using automatic, semi-automatic, and manual tools. The segmentation can then be used for a variety of subsequent tasks, such as volumetric analysis, density analysis, shape analysis, or the generation of 3D computer models for visualization, numerical simulations, or rapid prototyping or 3D printing. Other key Amira features are multi-planar and volume visualization, image registration, filament tracing, cell separation and analysis, tetrahedral mesh generation, fiber-tracking from diffusion tensor imaging (DTI) data, skeletonization, spatial graph analysis, and stereoscopic rendering of 3D data over multiple displays and immersive virtual reality environments, including CAVEs. As a commercial product Amira requires the purchase of a license or an academic subscription. A time-limited, but full-featured evaluation version is available for download free of charge.

== History ==
=== 1993–1998: Research software ===
Amira's roots go back to 1993 and the Department for Scientific Visualization, headed by Hans-Christian Hege at the Zuse Institute Berlin (ZIB). The ZIB is a research institute for mathematics and informatics. The Scientific Visualization department's mission is to help solve computationally and scientifically challenging tasks in medicine, biology, engineering and materials science. For this purpose, it develops algorithms and software for 2D, 3D, and 4D data visualization and visually supported exploration and analysis. At that time, the young visualization group at the ZIB had experience with the extendable, data flow-oriented visualization environments apE, IRIS Explorer, and Advanced Visualization Studio (AVS), but was not satisfied with these products' interactivity, flexibility, and ease-of-use for non-computer scientists.

Therefore, the development of a new software system was started in a research project within a medically oriented, multi-disciplinary collaborative research center. Based on experiences that Tobias Höllerer had gained in late 1993 with the new graphics library IRIS Inventor, it was decided to utilize that library. The development of the medical planning system was performed by Detlev Stalling, who later became the chief software architect of Amira. The new software was called "HyperPlan", highlighting its initial target application – a planning system for hyperthermia cancer treatment. The system was being developed on Silicon Graphics (SGI) computers, which at the time were the standard workstations used for high-end graphics computing. The software was based on libraries such as OpenGL (originally IRIS GL), Open Inventor (originally IRIS Inventor), and the graphical user interface libraries X11, Motif (software), and ViewKit. In 1998, X11/Motif/Viewkit were replaced by the Qt toolkit.

The HyperPlan framework served as the base for more and more projects at the ZIB and was used by a growing number of researchers in collaborating institutions. The projects included applications in medical image computing, medical visualization, neurobiology, confocal microscopy, flow visualization, molecular analytics and computational astrophysics.

=== 1998–today: Commercially supported product ===
The growing number of users of the system started to exceed the capacities that ZIB could spare for software distribution and support, as ZIB's primary mission was algorithmic research. Therefore, the spin-off company Indeed – Visual Concepts GmbH was founded by Hans-Christian Hege, Detlev Stalling, and Malte Westerhoff.

In February 1998 the HyperPlan software was given the new, application-neutral name "Amira". This name is not an acronym, but was chosen for being pronounceable in different languages and providing a suitable connotation, namely "to look at" or "to wonder at", from the Latin verb "admirare" (to admire), which reflects a basic situation in data visualization.

A major re-design of the software was undertaken by Detlev Stalling and Malte Westerhoff in order to make it a commercially supportable product and to make it available on non-SGI computers as well. In March 1999, the first version of the commercial Amira was exhibited at the CeBIT tradeshow in Hannover, Germany on SGI IRIX and Hewlett-Packard UniX (HP-UX) booths. Versions for Linux and Microsoft Windows followed within the following twelve months. Later Mac OS X support was added. Indeed – Visual Concepts GmbH selected the Bordeaux, France and San Diego, United States based company TGS, Inc. as the worldwide distributor for Amira and completed five major releases (up to version 3.1) in the subsequent four years.

In 2003 both Indeed – Visual Concepts GmbH, as well as TGS, Inc. were acquired by Massachusetts-based Mercury Computer Systems, Inc. (NASDAQ:MRCY) and became part of Mercury's newly formed life sciences business unit, later branded Visage Imaging. In 2009, Mercury Computer Systems, Inc. spun off Visage Imaging again and sold it to Melbourne, Australia based Promedicus Ltd (ASX:PME), a leading provider of radiology information systems and medical IT solutions. During this time, Amira continued to be developed in Berlin, Germany and in close collaboration with the ZIB, still headed by the original creators of Amira. TGS, located in Bordeaux, France was sold by Mercury Computer systems to a French investor and renamed to Visualization Sciences Group (VSG). VSG continued the work on a complementary product named Avizo, based on the same source code but customized for material sciences.

In August 2012, FEI, to that date the largest OEM reseller of Amira, purchased VSG and the Amira business from Promedicus. This brought the two software sisters Amira and Avizo back into one hand. In August 2013, Visualization Sciences Group (VSG) became a business unit of FEI. In 2016 FEI has been bought by Thermo Fisher Scientific and became part of its Materials & Structural Analysis division in early 2017.

Amira and Avizo are still being marketed as two different products; Amira for life sciences and Avizo for materials science, but the development efforts are now joined once again. In the meantime, the number of scientific articles using the Amira / Avizo software, is in the order of 10 thousands.

== Amira options ==
=== Microscopy option ===
- Specific readers for microscopy data
- Image deconvolution
- Exploration of 3D imagery obtained from virtually any microscope
- Extraction and editing of filament networks from microscopy images

=== DICOM reader ===
- Import of clinical and preclinical data in DICOM format

=== Mesh option ===
- Generation of 3D finite element (FE) meshes from segmented image data
- Support for many state-of-the-art FE solver formats
- High-quality visualization of simulation mesh-based results, using scalar, vector, and tensor field display modules

=== Skeletonization option ===
- Reconstruction and analysis of neural and vascular networks
- Visualization of skeletonized networks
- Length and diameter quantification of network segments
- Ordering of segments in a tree graph
- Skeletonization of very large image stacks

=== Molecular option ===
- Advanced tools for the visualization of molecule models
- Hardware-accelerated volume rendering
- Powerful molecule editor
- Specific tools for complex molecular visualization

=== Developer option ===
- Creation of new custom components for visualizing or data processing
- Implementation of new file readers or writers
- C++ programming language
- Development wizard for getting started quickly

=== Neuro option ===
- Medical image analysis for DTI and brain perfusion
- Fiber tracking supporting several stream-line based algorithms
- Fiber separation into fiber bundles based on user defined source and destination regions
- Computation of tensor fields, diffusion weighted maps
- Eigenvalue decomposition of tensor fields
- Computation of mean transit time, cerebral blood flow, and cerebral blood volume

=== VR option ===
- Visualization of data on large tiled displays or in immersive Virtual Reality (VR) environments
- Support of 3D navigation devices
- Fast multi-threaded and distributed rendering

=== Very large data option ===
- Support for visualization of image data exceeding the available main memory, using efficient out-of-core data management
- Extensions of many standard modules, such as orthogonal and oblique slicing, volume rendering, and isosurface rendering, to work on out-of-core data

== Application areas ==
- Anatomy
- Biochemistry
- Biophysics
- Cellular microbiology
- Computational fluid dynamics
- Cryo-electron tomography
- Diffusion MRI/Tractography
- Embryology
- Endocrinology
- Finite Element Modelling
- Histology
- Materials science
- Medical imaging
- Microscopy in life and materials sciences
- Molecular biology
- Neuroscience
- Orthopedics
- Otolaryngology
- Preclinical imaging
- Urology
