= Hans-Christian Hege =

German Physicist

Hans-Christian Hege (German: [hans kʁɪsti̯aːn ˈheːɡə]) is a German physicist and computer scientist who has done fundamental work in the field of data visualization.

== Career ==
Hans-Christian Hege studied from 1977 to 1984 as a scholarship holder of the German Academic Scholarship Foundation, majoring in physics and minoring in mathematics and philosophy at the Free University of Berlin. From 1984 to 1989 he was a research assistant at the local Institute for Theory of Elementary Particles and worked in the field of quantum field theory, in particular on the computer simulation of lattice gauge theories. In 1986, together with the computer scientists Rolf Herken, Wolfgang Krüger and Robert Hödicke and three investors, he founded the software company Mental Images, where he worked as a senior scientist in software development until 1989.

From 1989 to 2020, Hege worked as a scientist at the Zuse Institute Berlin (ZIB), initially in the fields of high-performance computing and computational physics. In 1991, he founded a department for parallel computing and visualization (today: Visual and Data-Centric Computing), which he developed into an internationally visible research center for visual data analysis. An important focus was the development of the visualization program Amira. The Amira software and its sister product Avizo are now distributed worldwide by Thermo Fisher Scientific Inc. and are used in many different research fields.

Hege is a co-founder of other companies with business areas in the field of computer-based visualization (1999: Indeed - Visual Concepts GmbH, now part of Visage Imaging GmbH; 2005: Lenné3D GmbH).

He is a founding member of the DFG research cluster MATHEON, the ECMath research network of the Einstein Foundation Berlin and the Cluster of Excellence MATH+.

He regularly gave lectures on scientific visualization to doctoral students in computer science at the Pompeu Fabra University in Barcelona as well as to students of digital film design at the German Film School / Academy of Digital Media Production (where he was appointed honorary professor in 2003), the Babelsberg Film School and the Media Design University in Berlin. He is also co-editor of the book series Mathematics and Visualization and the film series VideoMath published by the scientific publisher Springer as well as several monographs on the subject of scientific visualization.

In 2016 he was appointed a Fellow of Eurographics. Hege received several Best Paper Awards and honorary mentions, as well as awards for outstanding visualizations and computer animations. Furthermore, he received the 2024 Lifetime Achievement Award of the IEEE Visualization and Graphics Technical Community for a lifetime of fundamental technical contributions to visualization and visualization software.

== Edited books ==
- (with Konrad Polthier) Visualization and Mathematics – Experiments, Simulations and Environments, Springer, 1997
- (with Konrad Polthier) Mathematical Visualization – Algorithms, Applications and Numerics, Springer, 1998
- (with Konrad Polthier) Visualization and Mathematics III, Springer, 2003
- (with Raghu Machiraju) Volume Graphics 2007, AK Peters, Wellesley, MA, USA, 2007
- (with David Laidlaw, Renato Pajarola and Oliver Staadt) Volume and Point-Based Graphics 2008, Eurographics Association, Aire-la-Ville, Switzerland, 2008
- (with Konrad Polthier and Gerik Scheuermann) Topology-Based Methods in Visualization II, Springer, 2009
- (with Lars Linsen, Hans Hagen and Bernd Hamann) Visualization in Medicine and Life Sciences II, Springer, 2012
- (with Lars Linsen and Bernd Hamann) Visualization in Medicine and Life Sciences III, Springer, 2016
