= Dielectric Shader =

Shading technique based on a dielectric model of physics

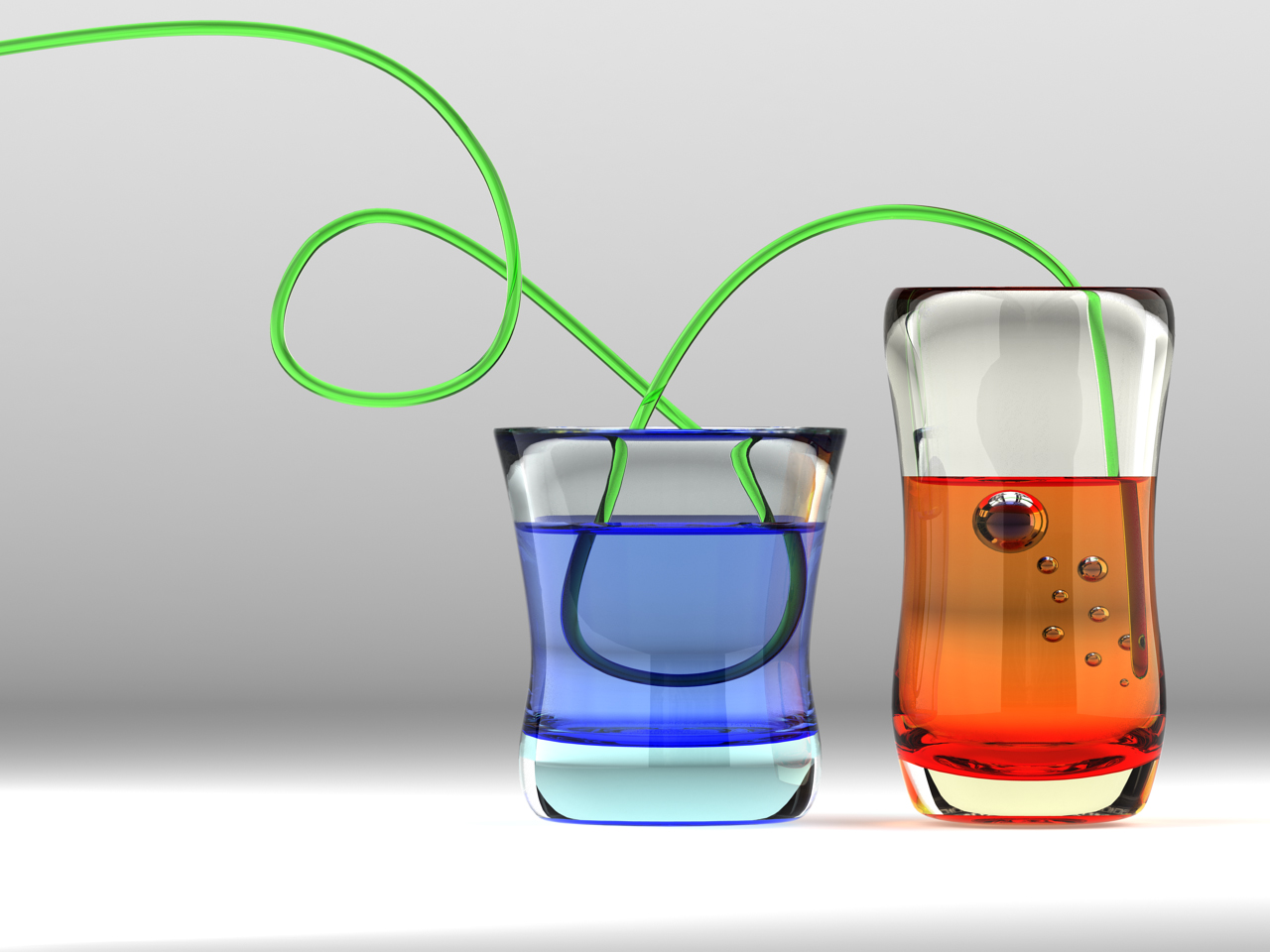
Three dielectric interfaces rendered using the shader.

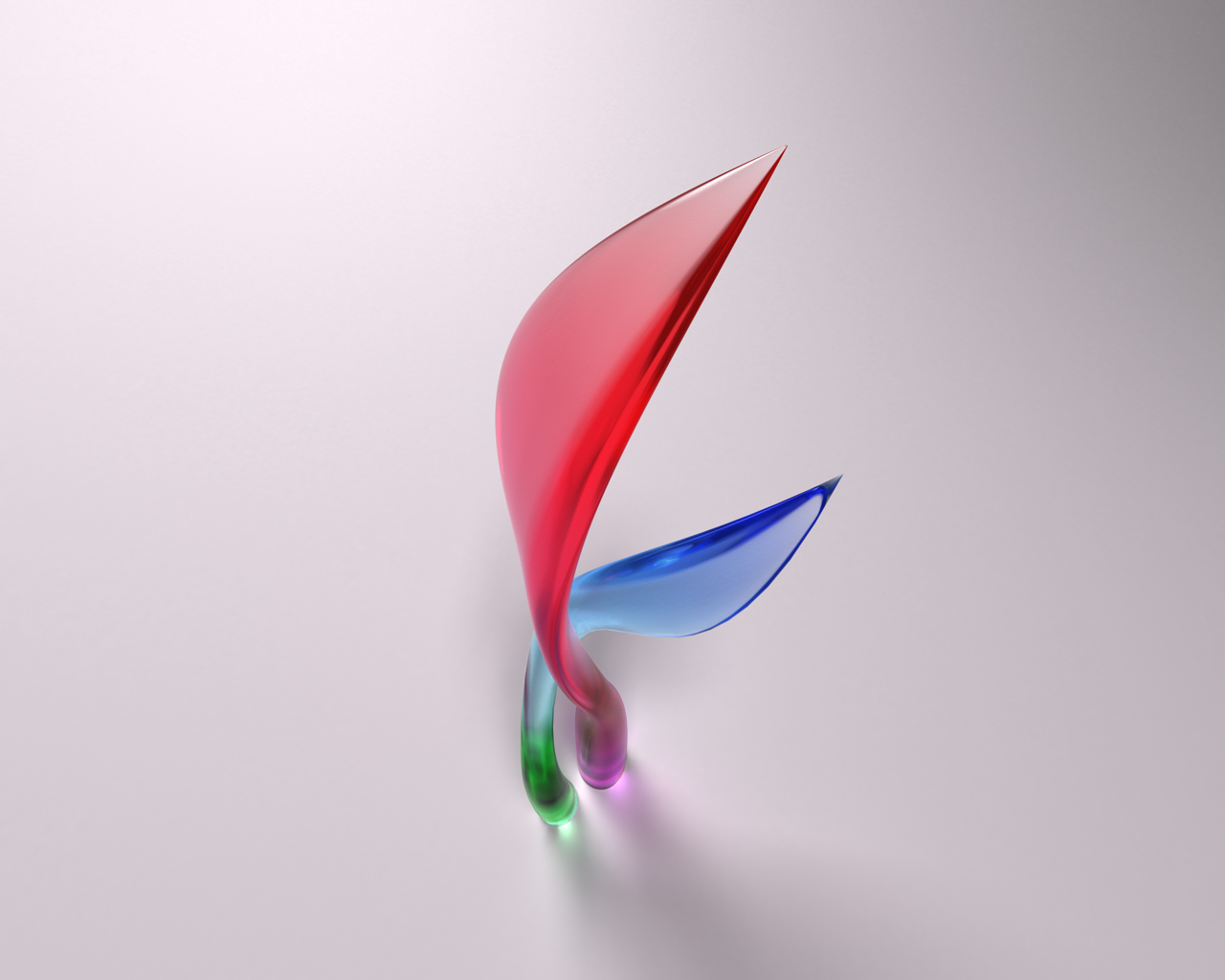
A very accurate render using the shader.

The Dielectric Physical Phenomenon Shader is a shader used by the LightWave and Mental Ray 3D rendering engines. It is based on a dielectric model of physics, which describes how electromagnetic fields behave inside materials. The dielectric shader is able to realistically render the behavior of light rays passing through materials with differing refractive indices, as well as attenuation of the ray as it passes through a material.

The shader uses Fresnel equations to simulate reflectance and transmittance of light passing through the dielectric interface, as well as using Snell's law to determine the angle of refraction. In addition Beer's law is used to determine absorption of rays passing through dielectric materials.

Two types of dielectric interfaces are supported:

- dielectric-air between a dielectric material and air.
- dielectric-dielectric between two dielectric materials.

== Gallery ==
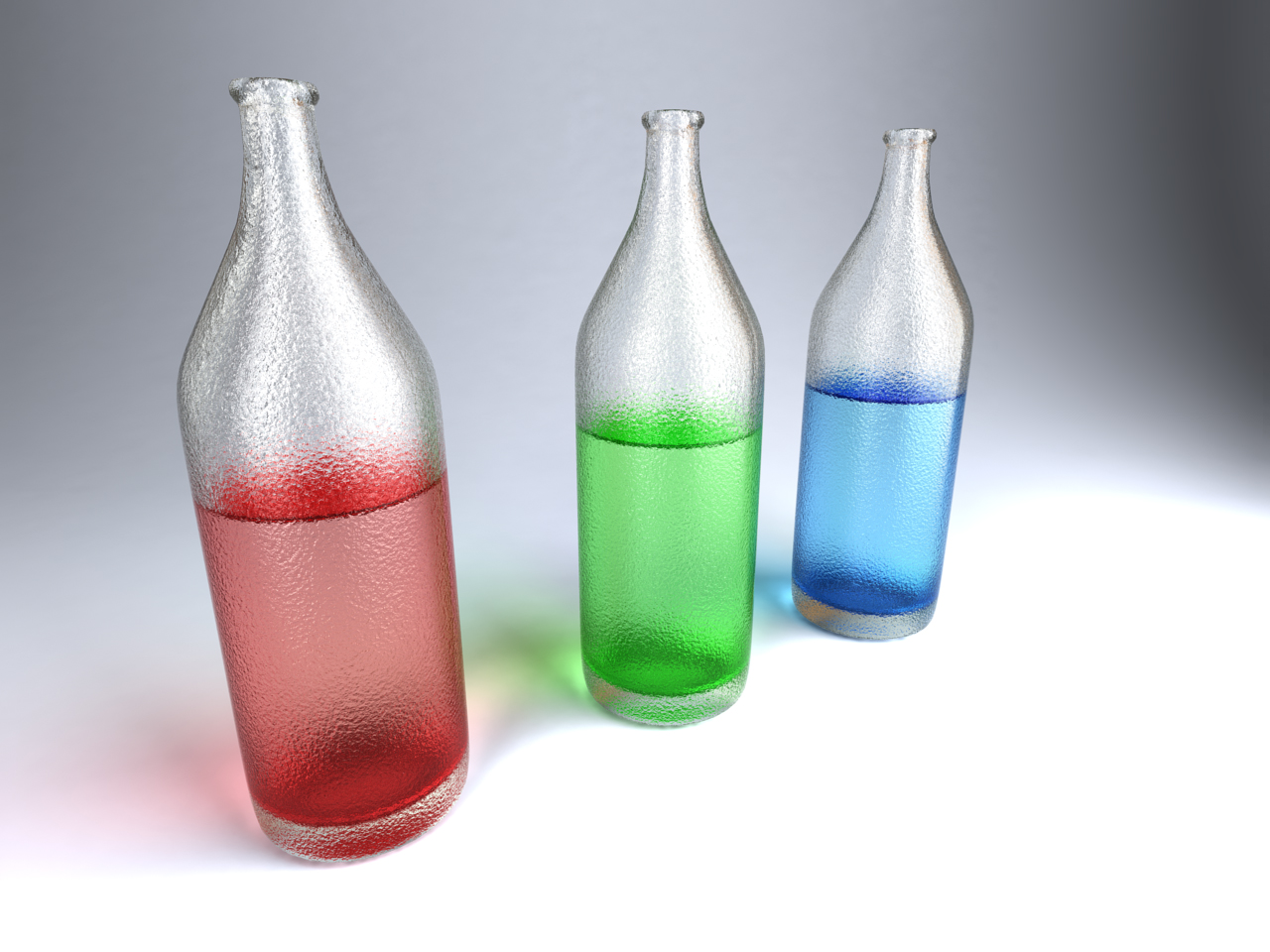
Frosted glass using Dielectric and Spekle bump mapping.

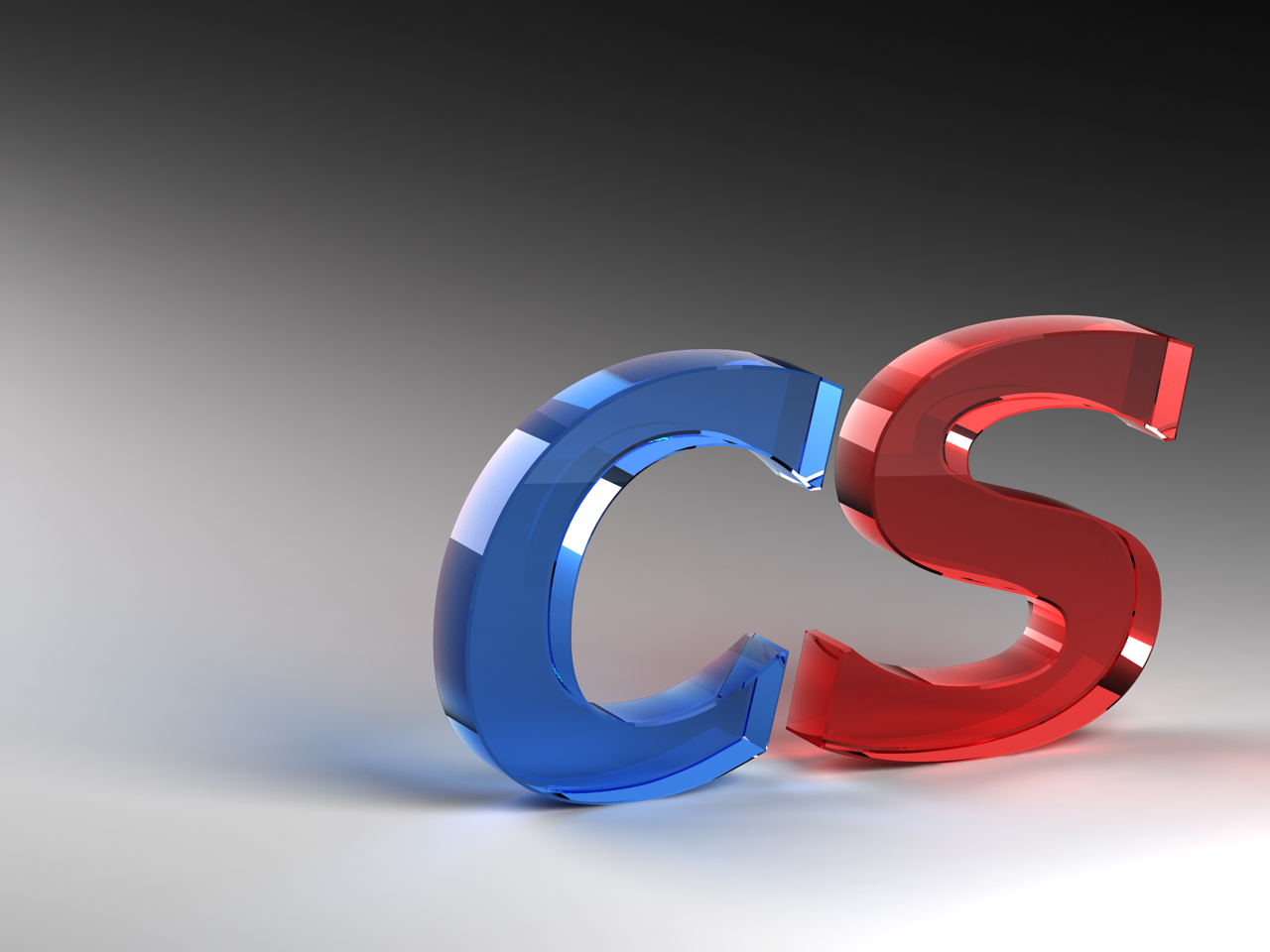
Solid glass letters with an IOR of 1.333.

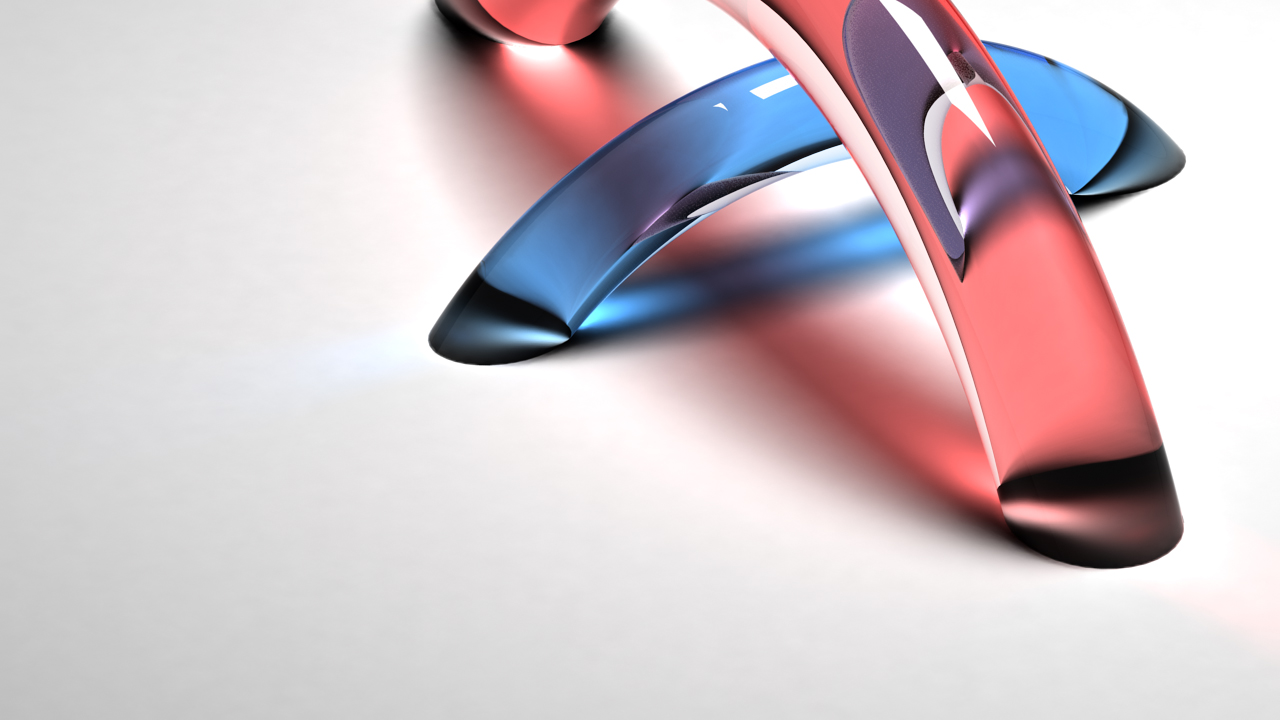
Two solid dielectric objects overlapping to show the refracting effect.
