= Cranston/Csuri Productions =

American computer animation company

Cranston/Csuri Productions (CCP) was an American computer animation company based in Columbus, Ohio. It was founded in 1981 by artist Chuck Csuri and investor Robert Cranston Kanuth to commercially exploit computer animation technology created by Ohio State University's Computer Graphics Research Group (CGRG). Several of the CGRG researchers recruited into the company went on to notable VFX and animation careers, including John Berton, Tom DeFanti, and Steve Martino.

CCP and CGRG shared a single facility on campus, and were intended to work collaboratively: CGRG developed and maintained tools for character animation, procedural effects, modeling, and rendering that CCP used in approximately 800 groundbreaking animated television and advertising projects. Some of these were maintained as de facto open source projects, like the GRASS programming language and the animation system Twixt, and found wider popularity outside CCP itself.

CCP's business operations shut down late in 1987 following the collapse of promising initial efforts to license its software, which ran only on expensive, refrigerator-sized minicomputers. By the late '80s, computer animation production had begun to switch from minicomputers to cheaper microcomputers (desktops) with 3D graphics capabilities, such as SGI workstations running retail software like Alias Wavefront. This change not only launched many new competing production houses, but also rapidly eliminated the market for minicomputer-based graphics products. That same year, CCP and CGRG became part of Ohio State's Advanced Computing Center for the Arts and Design (ACCAD), which as of 2022 remains in operation.
