= Mental Ray =

3D rendering software (1989–2017)

- Original author: Mental Images
- Developer: Nvidia
- Release: 1989; 37 years ago
- Final release: 3.14
- Operating system: Linux, OS X, Microsoft Windows
- Type: Rendering system
- License: Proprietary software
- Website: www.nvidia.com/object/nvidia-mental-ray-products.html

Mental Ray (stylized as mental ray) is a discontinued production-quality ray tracing application for 3D rendering. Its Berlin-based developer Mental Images was acquired by Nvidia in 2007.

Mental Ray has been used in many feature films, including Hulk, The Matrix Reloaded and Revolutions, Star Wars: Episode II – Attack of the Clones, The Day After Tomorrow, and Poseidon.

In November 2017 Nvidia announced that it would no longer offer new Mental Ray subscriptions, citing their increased focus on supporting development products for third-party partners rather than end-user applications. Maintenance releases with bug fixes were published throughout 2018 for existing plugin customers.

== Features ==
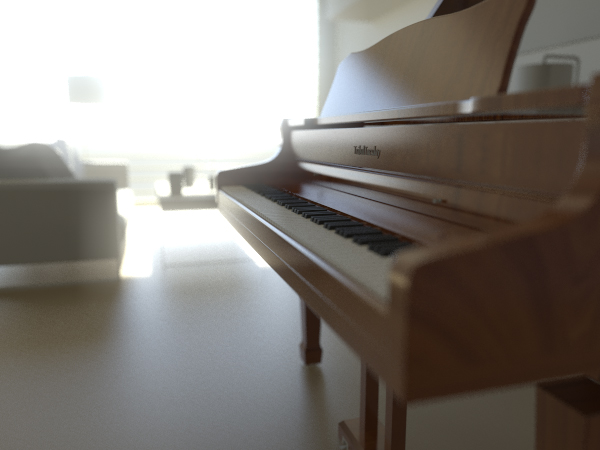
An image rendered using Mental Ray which demonstrates global illumination, photon maps, depth of field, ambient occlusion, glossy reflections, soft shadows and bloom

The primary feature of Mental Ray is the achievement of high performance through parallelism on both multiprocessor machines and across render farms. The software uses acceleration techniques such as scanline for primary visible surface determination and binary space partitioning for secondary rays via ray tracing, and used Quasi-Monte Carlo methods to solve the underlying light transport simulation. It also supports caustics and physically correct simulation of global illumination employing photon maps. Any combination of diffuse, glossy (soft or scattered), and specular reflection and transmission can be simulated.

Mental Ray was designed to be integrated into a third-party application using an API, or used as a standalone program using the .mi scene file format for batch-mode rendering. There were many programs integrating it, such as Alias Maya, 3D Studio Max, Cinema 4D and Revit, Softimage|XSI, Side Effects Software's Houdini, SolidWorks and Dassault Systèmes' CATIA. Most of these software front ends provided their own library of custom shaders (described below). However, assuming these shaders are available to mental ray, any .mi file can be rendered, regardless of the software that generated it.

Mental Ray is fully programmable and infinitely variable, supporting linked subroutines, also called shaders, written in C or C++. This feature can be used to create geometric elements at runtime of the renderer, procedural textures, bump and displacement maps, atmosphere and volume effects, environments, camera lenses, and light sources.

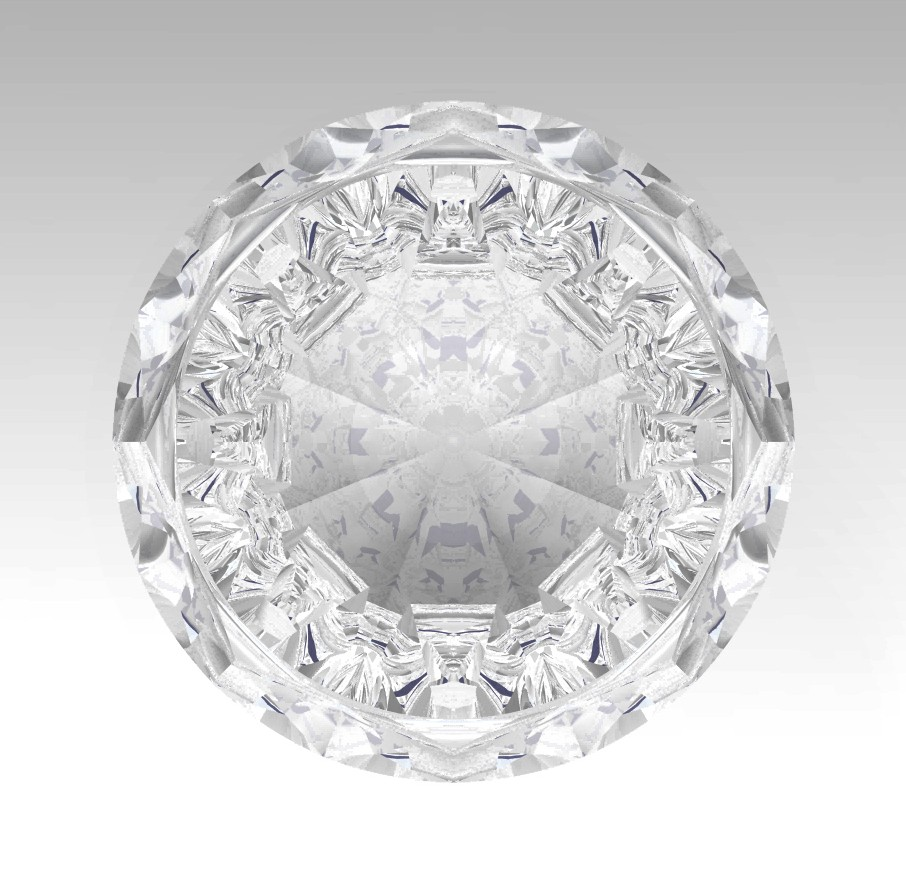
A diamond rendered using Mental Ray in CATIA V5R19 Photo Studio

Supported geometric primitives include polygons, subdivision surfaces, and trimmed free-form surfaces such as NURBS, Bézier, and Taylor monomial.

Phenomena consist of one or more shader trees (DAG). A phenomenon looks like regular shader to the user, and in fact may be a regular shader, but generally it will contain a link to a shader DAG, which may include the introduction or modification of geometry, introduction of lenses, environments, and compile options. The idea of a Phenomenon is to package elements and hide complexity.

Since 2010 Mental Ray has also included the iray rendering engine, which added GPU acceleration to the product. In 2013, the ambient occlusion pass was also accelerated by CUDA, and in 2015 the GI Next engine was added which can be used to compute all indirect/global illumination on GPUs.

In 2003, Mental Images received an Academy Award for mental ray's contributions to motion pictures.

== See also ==
- Dielectric Shader, able to realistically render the behavior of light rays passing through materials with differing refractive indices
- PhotoWorks (ray tracing software), previously part of SolidWorks, which used a version of the Mental Ray rendering engine as its renderer in older versions
