= PhotoWorks (software) =

Ray tracing software

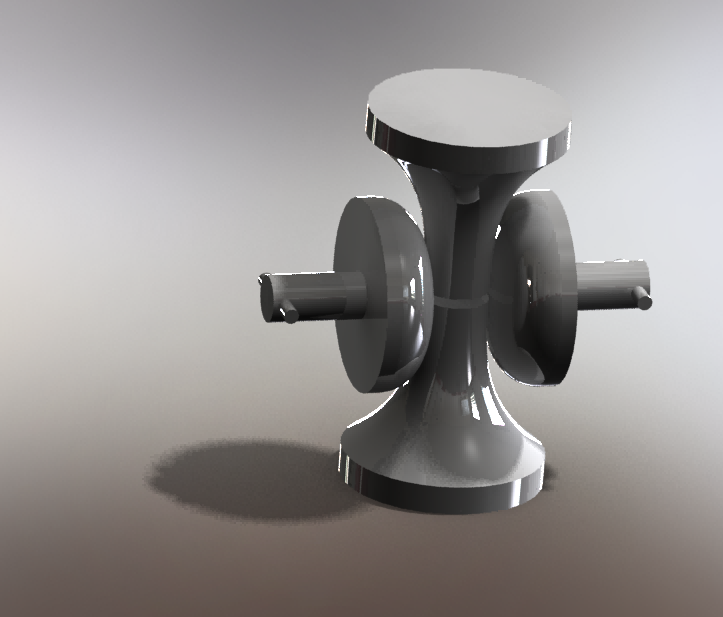
- Transmission made in SolidWorks and rendered with PhotoWorks
- Developer: Dassault Systèmes SolidWorks Corporation
- Type: raytrace, rendering

PhotoWorks is a raytrace rendering program created by Dassault Systèmes SolidWorks Corporation, formerly supplied as a photorealistic rendering add-in for SolidWorks. The program is based on the Mental Ray rendering engine. It has a library of scenes and materials that can be used with user-created SolidWorks files to create still frame images within the SolidWorks GUI.

Since the 2011 release of SolidWorks, PhotoWorks has been replaced by the PhotoView 360 rendering utility. A 2010 review comparing PhotoWorks with three other rendering programs for SolidWorks (including PhotoView 360) gave the program high marks for render speed and built-in materials, but low marks for realism and user interface.

Appearance File Type: *.p2m
