= Twixt animation system =

3D computer animation

Twixt was a 3D computer animation system originally created in 1984 by Julian Gomez at Sun Microsystems. It featured keyframes and tweening in a track-based graphical interface, and was capable of real-time wireframe playback. An Apple Macintosh port, called MacTwixt, was the first known 3D animation software to be released for the Macintosh. It was used by Apple's Advanced Technology Group (including future Pixar principals John Lasseter, Andrew Stanton, and Galyn Susman) to create the 1988 short film Pencil Test. Twixt was maintained until 1987 by Cranston/Csuri Productions, and used in their animated television and advertising projects.
