= Mental Images =

German software company

Mental Images GmbH
- Type: Subsidiary
- Industry: CGI, Computer software
- Founded: April 1986; 40 years ago in Berlin
- Headquarters: Berlin, Germany
- Key people: Rolf Herken (president, CEO, CTO)
- Products: Mental Ray, RealityServer, mental mill, MetaSL, mental mesh, iray, DiCE
- Number of employees: 80
- Parent: Nvidia
- Website: mentalimages.com

Mental Images GmbH (stylized as mental images) was a German computer-generated imagery (CGI) software company based in Berlin, Germany. In 2007, Nvidia acquired the company and rebranded it as the Nvidia Advanced Rendering Center (ARC). The company continues to provide similar products and technology, offering rendering and 3D modeling technology for entertainment, computer-aided design, scientific visualization and architecture.

The company was founded in April 1986 in Berlin, Germany, by the physicists and computer scientists Rolf Herken, Hans-Christian Hege, Robert Hödicke and Wolfgang Krüger as well as the economists Günter Ansorge, Frank Schnöckel and Hans Peter Plettner.

In 2003, Mental Images completed an investment round led by ViewPoint Ventures and another large international private equity investor. Since December 2007, Mental Images GmbH has been a wholly owned subsidiary of the Nvidia Corporation. The company is headquartered in Berlin with subsidiaries in San Francisco (Mental Images Inc.) and Melbourne (Mental Images Pty. Ltd.) as well as an office in Stockholm. Following its acquisition by Nvidia, the company was renamed Nvidia Advanced Rendering Center (Nvidia ARC GmbH).

== Products ==
Mental Images was the developer of the rendering software mental ray, iray, mental mill, RealityServer, and DiCE. Mental ray is a production-quality render engine that has been used in many feature films, including Hulk, The Matrix Reloaded, The Matrix Revolutions, Star Wars: Episode II – Attack of the Clones, The Day After Tomorrow, and much more over three decades.

== Filmography ==
- Mental Images (1987) (movie awarded at Prix Ars Electronica 1987, 4 min, demonstrating the technical possibilities of the time)
- Asterix in America (1994) (3D computer animation "Storm Sequence" and digital effects, software development)
- Heaven (2002) (images computed with Mental Ray)
