= Cellular microbiology =

Scientific discipline

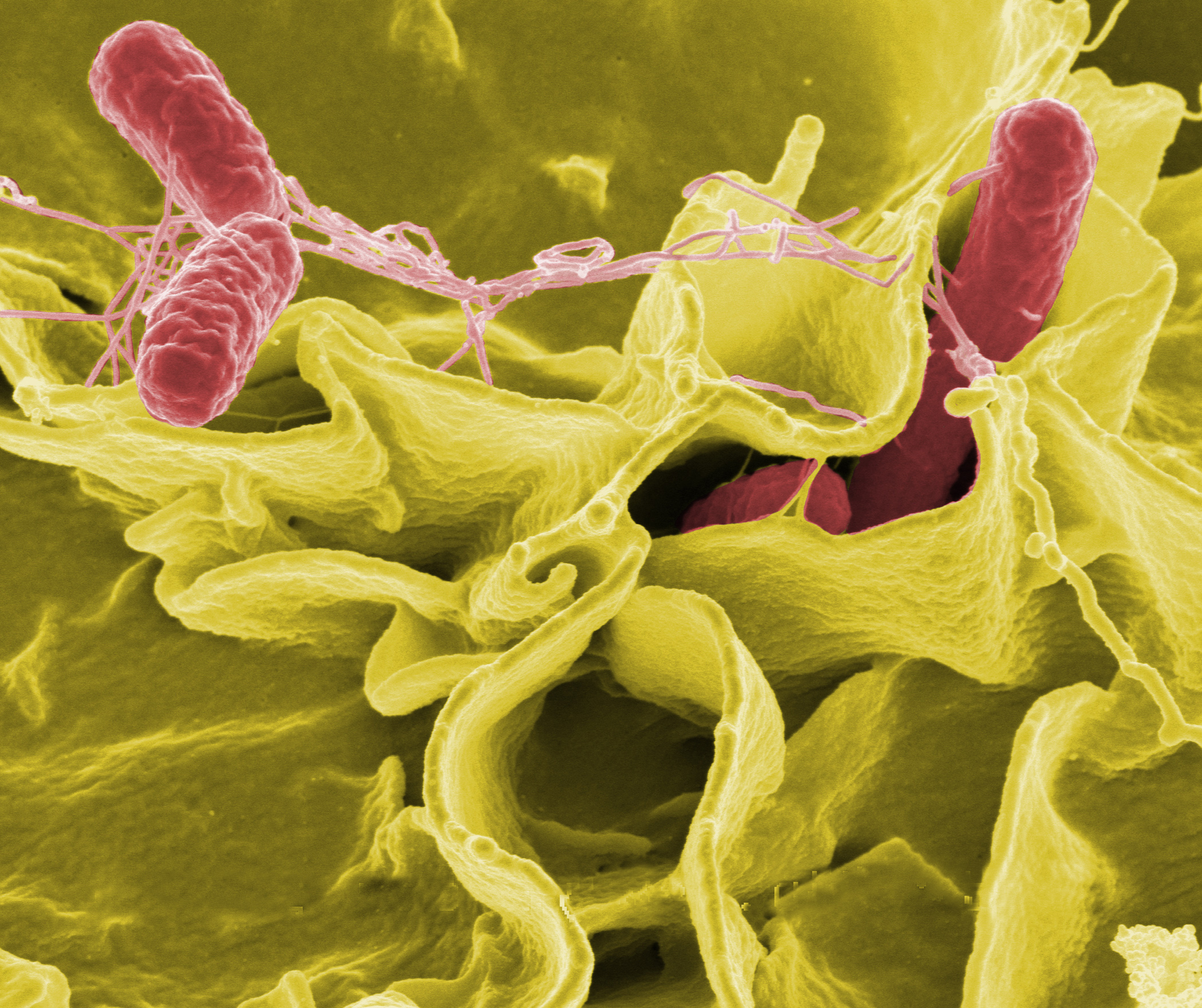
Salmonella bacteria (red) invade cultured human cells

Cellular microbiology is a discipline that bridges microbiology and cell biology to investigate interactions between microorganisms and host cells at the molecular level.

Cellular microbiology attempts to use pathogenic microorganisms as tools for cell-biology research, and to employ cell-biology methods to understand the pathogenicity of microorganisms. Toxins and virulence factors from microbes have been used for decades to influence processes in eukaryotic cells and to study them. It has increasingly appeared that applying a purified toxin on a cell does not always provide the complete picture, and that understanding the role of the toxin in pathogenicity, the way the toxin promotes the microbe, the way the toxin is produced and the co-evolution of the toxin and its host-cell counterparts, is crucial.

== History ==
The term "cellular microbiology" was coined by the authors of the book of the same title published in 1996. Cooperation and mutual dependency between microbiology and cell biology had been increasing in the years before that, and the emergence of a new discipline had been suggested and discussed in several scientific conferences. Early work often focused on the use of purified toxins as tools to dissect cellular processes, laying the groundwork for later integrative approaches. Over time, the field expanded beyond toxin-based studies to examine intact host-pathogen interactions. This shift was driven by the recognition that microbial factors operate within complex spatial and temporal contexts during infection. Advances in molecular genetics and imaging technologies further accelerated this transition, allowing researchers to observe infection processes in living cells.

Recently, the field of Cellular Microbiology has been expanded to incorporate investigation of the cell biology of microbes themselves. "The field of cellular microbiology is a coalescence of two fields: molecular microbiology and cell biology," said Professor Jacek Hawiger, Chair of Microbiology and Immunology at Vanderbilt University. Advances in technology have been central to the development of cellular microbiology, revealing a high level of organization within the bacterial cells themselves. For example, high-resolution fluorescence microscopy and atomic force microscopy are both being used to show just how sophisticated bacterial cells are.

== Scope and approaches ==
Cellular microbiology encompasses the study of how microorganisms interact with host cells using a combination of genetic, biochemical, and imaging techniques. A central approach in the field is the use of pathogens as experimental tools to probe fundamental cellular processes. By observing how microbes manipulate host pathways, researchers can identify key regulatory components and mechanisms.

The field has evolved from reductionist approaches involving the application of isolated toxins into more holistic studies of infection systems. New approaches integrate multiple levels of analysis studying molecular interactions, cellular dynamics, and systems-level responses. Multiple techniques in the literature are employed to investigate host-pathogen interactions including live-cell imaging, gene knockout studies, and high-throughput sequencing.

== Host-pathogen interactions ==
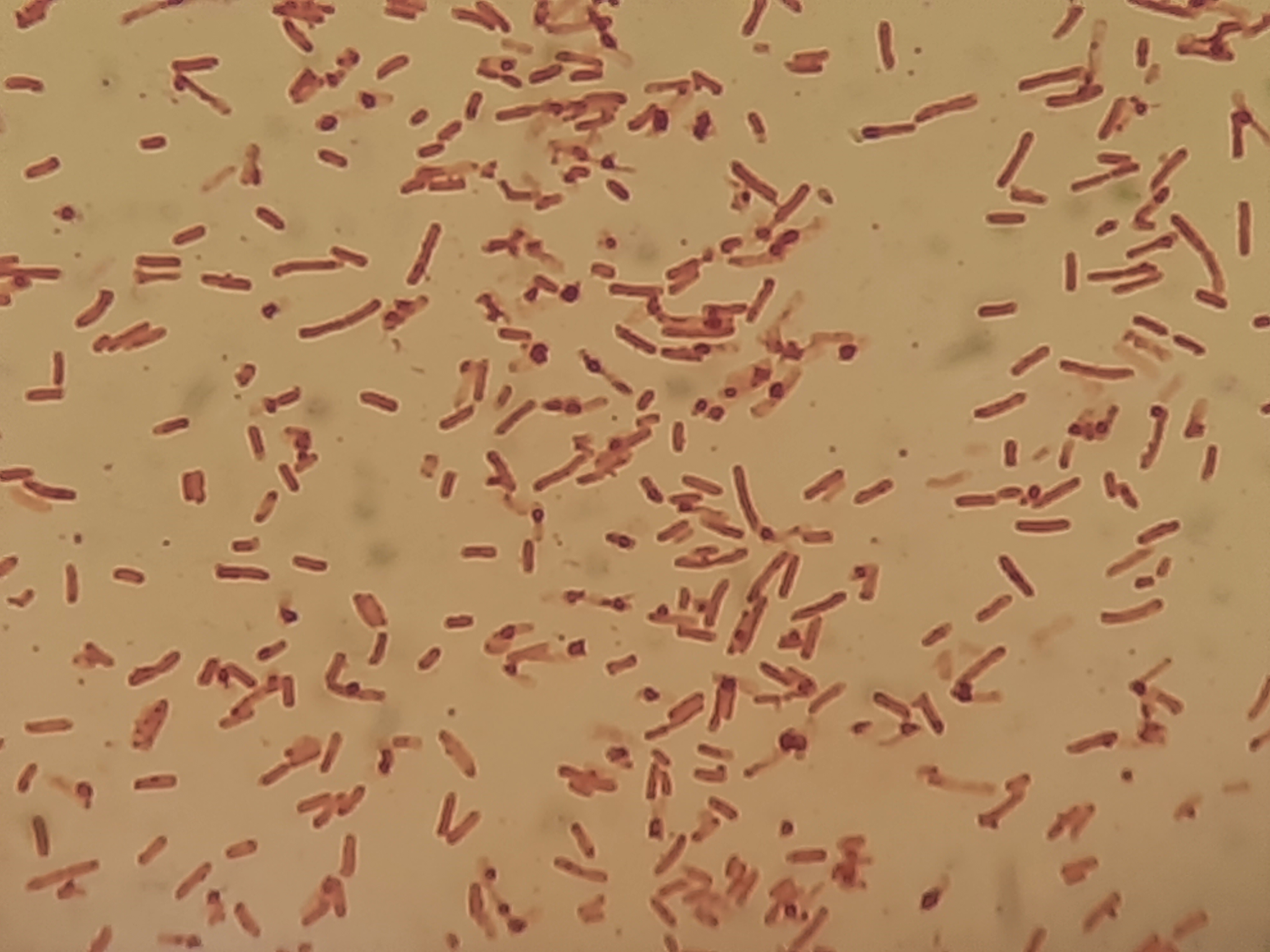
Gram-negative rods (GNRs) of Shigella sonnei

Numerous eukaryotic cellular processes have been clarified using microbial "tools". A major subject in this category is the cytoskeleton. Many microbes modify and influence the synthesis or degradation of the host-cell cytoskeleton, in particular the actin network. Intracellular microbes, such as the bacteria Salmonella and Shigella, elicit actin polymerization in host cells that otherwise do not internalize microbes (non-phagocytes). This causes the formation of projections that eventually engulf the bacteria. Bacteria such as Yersinia inhibit actin polymerization in phagocytes, thereby preventing their uptake. Cellular microbiology tries to understand these processes and how they promote infection.

Pathogens also target host signal transduction pathways to modulate cellular responses. Many microbial effectors interfere with kinase signaling networks, including MAPK pathways, to alter inflammation, apoptosis, and immune signaling.

Another major area of study is vesicle trafficking and intracellular compartmentalization. For example, Legionella pneumophila manipulates host vesicle transport systems to create a specialized replication vacuole, while Mycobacterium tuberculosis interferes with phagosome maturation, allowing it to persist within host macrophages.

In addition, pathogens can influence host gene expression, metabolism, cell cycle progression, and transcriptional regulation. These changes enable microbes to create intracellular environments that support their replication and survival, while also revealing fundamental aspects of cellular regulation.

== Microbial strategies and virulence mechanisms ==
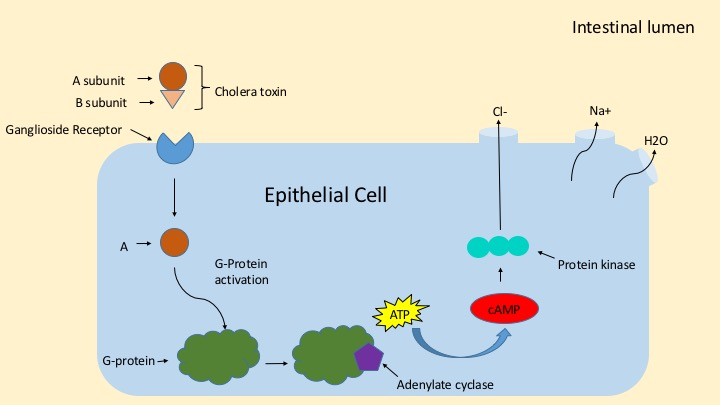
Cholera toxin signal transduction pathway into a host cell

Microorganisms employ a wide range of strategies to manipulate host cells, many of which involve specialized virulence factors. These include toxins, secretion systems, and effector proteins that directly interact with host cellular machinery. Bacterial secretion systems, such as type III and type IV systems, function as molecular syringes that deliver effector proteins into host cells.

Historically, microbial toxins have played a crucial role in advancing cell biology. For example, cholera toxin and botulinum toxin have been used to study signal transduction and vesicle trafficking, respectively. Virulence mechanisms also include strategies for immune evasion and intracellular survival. Many pathogens avoid detection by the host immune system or actively suppress immune responses, others establish protected niches within host cells, where they can replicate while avoiding host defenses.

== Medical and scientific significance ==
Cellular microbiology has significant implications for both medicine and basic science. By researching how pathogens interact with host cells, the field has contributed to the identification of novel therapeutic targets and strategies for combating infectious diseases. Insights from cellular microbiology have informed vaccine development, improved understanding of antimicrobial resistance, and advanced knowledge of host immune responses. The use of microbial tools has provided fundamental discoveries in cell biology within the subjects of cytoskeletal regulation, membrane trafficking, and much more.
