= Comparison of computer-aided design software =

The table below provides an overview of notable computer-aided design (CAD) software. It does not judge power, ease of use, or other user-experience aspects. The table does not include software that is still in development (beta software). For all-purpose 3D programs, see Comparison of 3D computer graphics software. CAD refers to a specific type of drawing and modelling software application that is used for creating designs and technical drawings. These can be 3D drawings or 2D drawings (like floor plans).

Title and developer	2D/3D or specialty fields	Platform	Latest release		License	Academic version?	User interface languages	Support for building information modelling?	Support for Industry Foundation Classes (version & MVD)?	Support for AutoCAD DXF?	Imports	Exports	Price (USD)
Title and developer	2D/3D or specialty fields	Platform	Version	Date	License	Academic version?	User interface languages	Support for building information modelling?	Support for Industry Foundation Classes (version & MVD)?	Support for AutoCAD DXF?	Imports	Exports	Price (USD)
ABViewer by CADSoftTools	2D/3D	Linux with Wine	Version 15.1	2023-02-01	Proprietary	Yes	en, fr, de, ru and others	No	No	Yes	DWG, DXF, DWF, DXT, 3DS, ACIS SAT, STL, IGES (.igs), STEP (.stp), OBJ, X_T, X_B, SLDPRT, GTS, TIN, ASE, B3D, GLM, GLX, GLA, LMTS, LWO, NURBS, NMF, OCT, PLY, VRML, MDC, MD2, MD3, MD5, SMD, BSP, WMF, EMF, PDF, CGM, SVG, SVGZ, EPS, PS, Hewlett-Packard HPGL (PLT, HGL, HG, HPG, PLO, HP, HP1, HP2, HP3, HPGL, HPGL2, HPP, GL, GL2, PRN, SPL, RTL, PCL), GED, RLA, RPF, CEL, PIC, CAL, CG4, GP4, GIF, CUT, PAL, DDS, FAX, HDR, IFF, ICO, EXR, IMB, JPG, JPEG, J2K, J2C, JNG, JP2, KOA, PCT, PICT, MNG, PSP, PCD, PSD, PDD, PNG, PPM, PGM, PBM, RAW, G3, BW, RGB, RGBA, SGI, RAS, TIF, TIFF, TGA, VST, ICB, VDA, WIN, BMP, RLE, DIB, WAP, WBMP, WBM, XBM, XPM, PCX	PDF, DWG, DXF, SWF, CGM, DXT, SVG, PLT, STL, OBJ, OBJF, NMF, LMTS, NC, BMP, GIF, JPG, PNG, TIF, TIFF, WMF, EMF, SWF	Varies depending on the license type
ABViewer by CADSoftTools	2D/3D	Windows	Version 15.1	2023-02-01	Proprietary	Yes	en, fr, de, ru and others	No	No	Yes		PDF, DWG, DXF, SWF, CGM, DXT, SVG, PLT, STL, OBJ, OBJF, NMF, LMTS, NC, BMP, GIF, JPG, PNG, TIF, TIFF, WMF, EMF, SWF	Varies depending on the license type
Alibre Design by Alibre, LLC	2D/3D	Windows	Version 28	2024	Proprietary	Yes	en, de, ja, fr, zh-Hant, pl, cs, es, da, pt-BR, sv	No	(version?)	Yes	DXF, DWG, STEP, IGES, SAT, 3DM, STL, OBJ, PLY, 3DS, WRL, Inventor, ProE, SolidEdge, CATIA, Parasolid, Solidworks	DXF, DWG, STEP, IGES, SAT, BIP, EMF, PDF, STL, Solidworks, Parasolid	$1,000 - $2,000
Allplan by Allplan GmbH	2D/3D architecture, engineering, road, bridge, BIM	Windows	Version 2023	2022	Proprietary	Yes	en, es, fr, de, ru, zh-Hant, ja, pl, cs, it, pt-BR and others	Yes	v2x3 CV2.0 & v4 Import and export certified	Until version 2023, incl. ACIS support	DXF, DWG, IFC, DGN, PDF, STL, OBJ, C4D, SKP, WRL, LandXML	DXF, DWG, IFC, DGN, PDF, STL, OBJ, C4D, SKP, WRL, 3DS	$4,000 - $9,000
Archicad by Graphisoft	2D/3D architecture, BIM	macOS	Version 27	2023	Proprietary	Yes; No cost	en, de, es, fr, it, pt, ru, ja, pl, cs, hu, nl, fi, sv, no, da, tr, el, zh-Hans, ko, zh-Hant	Yes	v2x3 CV2.0 & v4 Import and export certified	Yes	3D Studio, ACIS SAT, BMP, DGN, DWF, DWG, DXF, EMF, EPS, GIF, HPGL/PLT, IFC/IFCXML, JP2, JPEG, PDF, PICT, PNG, PSD, QTIF, SketchUp, TGA/Targa, TIF/TIFF, WMF, FBX	3D Studio, Artlantis/ATL, AVI, BMP, DGN, DWF, DWG, DXF, EMF, EPS, EPX - Piranesi, FACT - ElectricImage, GIF, HPGL/PLT, IFC/IFCXML, JP2, JPEG, MOV, LP - Lightscape, OBJ, PDF, PICT, PNG, PSD, QTIF, SGI, Keyhole Markup Language, TGA/Targa, TIF/TIFF, U3D, WRL, WMF	$4,250
Archicad by Graphisoft	2D/3D architecture, BIM	Windows	Version 27	2023	Proprietary	Yes; No cost	en, de, es, fr, it, pt, ru, ja, pl, cs, hu, nl, fi, sv, no, da, tr, el, zh-Hans, ko, zh-Hant	Yes	v2x3 CV2.0 & v4 Import and export certified	Yes	3D Studio, ACIS SAT, BMP, DGN, DWF, DWG, DXF, EMF, EPS, GIF, HPGL/PLT, IFC/IFCXML, JP2, JPEG, PDF, PICT, PNG, PSD, QTIF, SketchUp, TGA/Targa, TIF/TIFF, WMF, FBX	3D Studio, Artlantis/ATL, AVI, BMP, DGN, DWF, DWG, DXF, EMF, EPS, EPX - Piranesi, FACT - ElectricImage, GIF, HPGL/PLT, IFC/IFCXML, JP2, JPEG, MOV, LP - Lightscape, OBJ, PDF, PICT, PNG, PSD, QTIF, SGI, Keyhole Markup Language, TGA/Targa, TIF/TIFF, U3D, WRL, WMF	$4,250
AutoCAD by Autodesk	2D/3D, architecture, drafting	macOS, No for discipline-specific vertical products, e.g. AutoCAD Architecture	2026.1.1	2025-11-06	Proprietary	Yes	pt-BR, en, cs, fr, de, hu, it, ja, ko, pl, ru, zh-Hans, es, zh-Hant	limited for some verticals	for some verticals	Yes	DXF, DWG, DWS, DWT, WMF, SAT, 3DS, FBX, DGN	3DS (requires 3dsout), DXF, DWG, PDF, DWF, FBX, BMP, DGN	$245 per month; $1955 per year; $5865 per 3 years
AutoCAD by Autodesk	2D/3D, architecture, drafting	Windows	2026.1.1	2025-11-06	Proprietary	Yes	pt-BR, en, cs, fr, de, hu, it, ja, ko, pl, ru, zh-Hans, es, zh-Hant	limited for some verticals	for some verticals	Yes	DXF, DWG, DWS, DWT, WMF, SAT, 3DS, FBX, DGN	3DS (requires 3dsout), DXF, DWG, PDF, DWF, FBX, BMP, DGN	$245 per month; $1955 per year; $5865 per 3 years
AutoCAD by Autodesk	2D/3D, architecture, drafting	Android	2026.1.1	2025-11-06	Proprietary	Yes	pt-BR, en, cs, fr, de, hu, it, ja, ko, pl, ru, zh-Hans, es, zh-Hant	limited for some verticals	for some verticals	Yes	DXF, DWG, DWS, DWT, WMF, SAT, 3DS, FBX, DGN	3DS (requires 3dsout), DXF, DWG, PDF, DWF, FBX, BMP, DGN	$245 per month; $1955 per year; $5865 per 3 years
AutoCAD by Autodesk	2D/3D, architecture, drafting	iOS	2026.1.1	2025-11-06	Proprietary	Yes	pt-BR, en, cs, fr, de, hu, it, ja, ko, pl, ru, zh-Hans, es, zh-Hant	limited for some verticals	for some verticals	Yes	DXF, DWG, DWS, DWT, WMF, SAT, 3DS, FBX, DGN	3DS (requires 3dsout), DXF, DWG, PDF, DWF, FBX, BMP, DGN	$245 per month; $1955 per year; $5865 per 3 years
Autodesk Inventor	3D	Windows	2024.1.1	2023-08-08	Proprietary	Yes	en and others	Yes	version?	Yes	ACIS SAT, DXF, DWG, IGES, Pro/Engineer, STEP, .dwf, .wire, .catpart, .catproduct, .jt, .x b, .x t, .prt (NX), .asm, .g, .neu, Solidworks, ProE, Catia, .stl	ACIS SAT, DXF, DWG, IGES, STEP, .dwf, .catpart, .catproduct, .bmp, .gif, .jpeg, .png, .tiff, .iges, .jt, .pdf, .x b, .x t, .g, .neu, STL (file format), .xgl, .zgl	$300 per month; $2415 per year; $7245 per 3 years
Autodesk Fusion	2D/3D	Windows, macOS, android, iOS, Web browser			Proprietary	Yes	en, de, fr, it, es, ko, zh, ja, pt, pl, tr	No	No	Yes	3dm, 3mf, asm, brd, cam360, CATPart, CATProduct, dwg, dxf, f3d, fbx, g, iam, ige, iges, igs, ipt, jt , neu, obj, prt, sab, sat, sch, skp, sldasm, sldprt, smb, smt, ste, step, stl, stp, svg, tsm, wire, x_b, x_t, 123dx	f3d, iam, ipt, skp, sab, sat, smb, smt, step, 3mf, fbx, obj, spd, stl, usdz, dwg, f2t, dxf, cam360, fsch, fbrd, flbr, iges smp	
Blender by Blender Foundation	2D/3D modeling, rendering, animation	Windows, macOS, Linux	5.x	2025	GPL	Yes	Multiple	Via Bonsai Bim addon	Via Bonsai Bim addon	Yes	DXF, STL, OBJ, FBX, PLY, glTF, 3DS	DXF, STL, OBJ, FBX, PLY, glTF	No cost
BricsCAD by Bricsys	2D/3D AEC, parametric direct modeling, BIM, mechanical, sheet metal, rendering	macOS	V24 (24.2.03 English) (64-bit, 32-bit)	2022-03-18	Proprietary	Yes; No cost	en, cs, de, es, fr, hu, it, ja, ko, lt, pl, pt-BR, ru, vi, zh-Hans, zh-Hant	Yes	version?	Yes	DWG 2.5 to 2013, DXF, ACIS SAT, DAE (COLLADA), BMP, JPEG, PCX, PNG, GIF, TGA, TIF, JP2, J2K, ECW, SID With extra Communicator license: STE, STP, STEP, IGS, IGES, CATIA V4/V5, VDA, IAM, IPT, Parasolid, PAR, PSM, PRT, ASM, PRT, SLDPTR/SLDASM	DWG 2.5 to 2013, DXF, DWF, ACIS SAT, DAE (COLLADA), SLT (3D Printing), PDF, BMP, WMF, EMF With extra Communicator license: STE, STP, STEP, IGS, IGES, CATIA V4/V5, VDA, 3D PDF	$1020 Platinum, $680 Pro, $550 Classic, $610 Communicator
BricsCAD by Bricsys	2D/3D AEC, parametric direct modeling, BIM, mechanical, sheet metal, rendering	Fedora	V24 (24.2.03 English) (64-bit, 32-bit)	2022-03-18	Proprietary	Yes; No cost	en, cs, de, es, fr, hu, it, ja, ko, lt, pl, pt-BR, ru, vi, zh-Hans, zh-Hant	Yes	version?	Yes	DWG 2.5 to 2013, DXF, ACIS SAT, DAE (COLLADA), BMP, JPEG, PCX, PNG, GIF, TGA, TIF, JP2, J2K, ECW, SID With extra Communicator license: STE, STP, STEP, IGS, IGES, CATIA V4/V5, VDA, IAM, IPT, Parasolid, PAR, PSM, PRT, ASM, PRT, SLDPTR/SLDASM	DWG 2.5 to 2013, DXF, DWF, ACIS SAT, DAE (COLLADA), SLT (3D Printing), PDF, BMP, WMF, EMF With extra Communicator license: STE, STP, STEP, IGS, IGES, CATIA V4/V5, VDA, 3D PDF	$1020 Platinum, $680 Pro, $550 Classic, $610 Communicator
BricsCAD by Bricsys	2D/3D AEC, parametric direct modeling, BIM, mechanical, sheet metal, rendering	openSUSE	V24 (24.2.03 English) (64-bit, 32-bit)	2022-03-18	Proprietary	Yes; No cost	en, cs, de, es, fr, hu, it, ja, ko, lt, pl, pt-BR, ru, vi, zh-Hans, zh-Hant	Yes	version?	Yes	DWG 2.5 to 2013, DXF, ACIS SAT, DAE (COLLADA), BMP, JPEG, PCX, PNG, GIF, TGA, TIF, JP2, J2K, ECW, SID With extra Communicator license: STE, STP, STEP, IGS, IGES, CATIA V4/V5, VDA, IAM, IPT, Parasolid, PAR, PSM, PRT, ASM, PRT, SLDPTR/SLDASM	DWG 2.5 to 2013, DXF, DWF, ACIS SAT, DAE (COLLADA), SLT (3D Printing), PDF, BMP, WMF, EMF With extra Communicator license: STE, STP, STEP, IGS, IGES, CATIA V4/V5, VDA, 3D PDF	$1020 Platinum, $680 Pro, $550 Classic, $610 Communicator
BricsCAD by Bricsys	2D/3D AEC, parametric direct modeling, BIM, mechanical, sheet metal, rendering	Ubuntu	V24 (24.2.03 English) (64-bit, 32-bit)	2022-03-18	Proprietary	Yes; No cost	en, cs, de, es, fr, hu, it, ja, ko, lt, pl, pt-BR, ru, vi, zh-Hans, zh-Hant	Yes	version?	Yes	DWG 2.5 to 2013, DXF, ACIS SAT, DAE (COLLADA), BMP, JPEG, PCX, PNG, GIF, TGA, TIF, JP2, J2K, ECW, SID With extra Communicator license: STE, STP, STEP, IGS, IGES, CATIA V4/V5, VDA, IAM, IPT, Parasolid, PAR, PSM, PRT, ASM, PRT, SLDPTR/SLDASM	DWG 2.5 to 2013, DXF, DWF, ACIS SAT, DAE (COLLADA), SLT (3D Printing), PDF, BMP, WMF, EMF With extra Communicator license: STE, STP, STEP, IGS, IGES, CATIA V4/V5, VDA, 3D PDF	$1020 Platinum, $680 Pro, $550 Classic, $610 Communicator
BricsCAD by Bricsys	2D/3D AEC, parametric direct modeling, BIM, mechanical, sheet metal, rendering	Windows; 10, 8, 7, Vista	V24 (24.2.03 English) (64-bit, 32-bit)	2022-03-18	Proprietary	Yes; No cost	en, cs, de, es, fr, hu, it, ja, ko, lt, pl, pt-BR, ru, vi, zh-Hans, zh-Hant	Yes	version?	Yes	DWG 2.5 to 2013, DXF, ACIS SAT, DAE (COLLADA), BMP, JPEG, PCX, PNG, GIF, TGA, TIF, JP2, J2K, ECW, SID With extra Communicator license: STE, STP, STEP, IGS, IGES, CATIA V4/V5, VDA, IAM, IPT, Parasolid, PAR, PSM, PRT, ASM, PRT, SLDPTR/SLDASM	DWG 2.5 to 2013, DXF, DWF, ACIS SAT, DAE (COLLADA), SLT (3D Printing), PDF, BMP, WMF, EMF With extra Communicator license: STE, STP, STEP, IGS, IGES, CATIA V4/V5, VDA, 3D PDF	$1020 Platinum, $680 Pro, $550 Classic, $610 Communicator
BRL-CAD by United States Army Research Laboratory	3D design and simulation for military vehicles	POSIX (BSD–Linux–Unix like OS), Packages for FreeBSD, IRIX, Linux, macOS, Solaris	7.44.0	2026-07-24	LGPL-2.1-only	Yes; No cost	en	Unknown	No	Yes	DXF, Elysium Neutral Facetted, Euclid, FASTGEN, IGES, Jack, NASTRAN, Pro/E, STL, TANKILL, Unigraphics, Viewpoint Datalabs Format	DXF, Euclid, IGES, Jack, STL, TANKILL, VRML, OBJ, X3D	No cost
BRL-CAD by United States Army Research Laboratory	3D design and simulation for military vehicles	Windows	7.44.0	2026-07-24	LGPL-2.1-only	Yes; No cost	en	Unknown	No	Yes	DXF, Elysium Neutral Facetted, Euclid, FASTGEN, IGES, Jack, NASTRAN, Pro/E, STL, TANKILL, Unigraphics, Viewpoint Datalabs Format	DXF, Euclid, IGES, Jack, STL, TANKILL, VRML, OBJ, X3D	No cost
BRL-CAD by United States Army Research Laboratory	3D design and simulation for military vehicles	Others	7.44.0	2026-07-24	LGPL-2.1-only	Yes; No cost	en	Unknown	No	Yes	DXF, Elysium Neutral Facetted, Euclid, FASTGEN, IGES, Jack, NASTRAN, Pro/E, STL, TANKILL, Unigraphics, Viewpoint Datalabs Format	DXF, Euclid, IGES, Jack, STL, TANKILL, VRML, OBJ, X3D	No cost
Caddie Professional by Advanced Computer Solutions	2D/3D CAE, rendering	Windows	27	2021	Proprietary	Foc	en	Yes	Yes	Yes	DWG, DXF, DRW, JPEG, BMP, TIFF, PNG, GIF, ECW, JPEG2000, ASCII, XLS	DWG, DXF, DRW, DWF, WMF, PDF, JPEG, BMP, TIFF, PNG, GIF	$106 - $3022
Cadwork by Cadwork informatik AG	2D/3D/4D/5D/6D CAE, rendering, CAM, BIM	HP-UX	30	2023	Proprietary	Yes	en, cs, fr, de, it, ja, pl, pt, ru, zh-Hans, es	Yes	Yes	Yes	DWG, DXF, PDF, JPEG, TIFF, PNG, SAT, IFC	DWG, DXF, PDF, JPEG, TIFF, SAT, IFC	$1,000 to $20,000
Cadwork by Cadwork informatik AG	2D/3D/4D/5D/6D CAE, rendering, CAM, BIM	Windows	30	2023	Proprietary	Yes	en, cs, fr, de, it, ja, pl, pt, ru, zh-Hans, es	Yes	Yes	Yes	DWG, DXF, PDF, JPEG, TIFF, PNG, SAT, IFC	DWG, DXF, PDF, JPEG, TIFF, SAT, IFC	$1,000 to $20,000
CATIA by Dassault Systèmes	2D/3D CAE	IBM AIX	R2023x	2023–11	Proprietary	€99, US$99, £89.7	en, fr, de, ja (at release date)	Yes	version?	Yes	some formats require extra license	some formats require extra license	$9000 to $65000 (depends on modules)
CATIA by Dassault Systèmes	2D/3D CAE	HP-UX	R2023x	2023–11	Proprietary	€99, US$99, £89.7	en, fr, de, ja (at release date)	Yes	version?	Yes	some formats require extra license	some formats require extra license	$9000 to $65000 (depends on modules)
CATIA by Dassault Systèmes	2D/3D CAE	Solaris	R2023x	2023–11	Proprietary	€99, US$99, £89.7	en, fr, de, ja (at release date)	Yes	version?	Yes	some formats require extra license	some formats require extra license	$9000 to $65000 (depends on modules)
CATIA by Dassault Systèmes	2D/3D CAE	Windows	R2023x	2023–11	Proprietary	€99, US$99, £89.7	en, fr, de, ja (at release date)	Yes	version?	Yes	some formats require extra license	some formats require extra license	$9000 to $65000 (depends on modules)
CATIA by Dassault Systèmes	2D/3D CAE	V4 runs on mainframe	R2023x	2023–11	Proprietary	€99, US$99, £89.7	en, fr, de, ja (at release date)	Yes	version?	Yes	some formats require extra license	some formats require extra license	$9000 to $65000 (depends on modules)
Cobalt by Ashlar-Vellum	2D/3D rendering, CAE, CAM	macOS, 10.13+, fully hyper-threaded ray tracing	v12	2023-08-17	Proprietary	Yes	en, bre, fr, de, it, pt, ru, sl, sv	No	No	Yes	3DS, ACIS SAT, AI, ASCII Text, BMP, CATIA v4, CGM, CCAD, CO (native), Drawing board, DWG/DXF, Facet, GIF, Grid Surface, IGS (IGES), JPEG, Parasolid XT, PICT, 2D PDF, PNG, PPM, Pro/E, Rhino 3DM, Spline, STP (STEP), VRML, XBM, XPM	ACIS SAT, AI, ASCII Text, BMP, CATIA v4, CGM, CO (native), Drawing board, DWG/DXF, EPS, Facet, GIF, Grid Surface, IGS (IGES), JPEG, Parasolid XT, 2D & 3D PDF, PICT, PNG, PPM, Pro/E, RAW Triangle, Shockwave 3D, STP (STEP), STL, VRML, XBM, XPM	$2,495 buy, or $995/year rent, or $94.95/month rent
Cobalt by Ashlar-Vellum	2D/3D rendering, CAE, CAM	Windows; 10, 11 (64-bit)	v12	2023-08-17	Proprietary	Yes	en, bre, fr, de, it, pt, ru, sl, sv	No	No	Yes	3DS, ACIS SAT, AI, ASCII Text, BMP, CATIA v4, CGM, CCAD, CO (native), Drawing board, DWG/DXF, Facet, GIF, Grid Surface, IGS (IGES), JPEG, Parasolid XT, PICT, 2D PDF, PNG, PPM, Pro/E, Rhino 3DM, Spline, STP (STEP), VRML, XBM, XPM	ACIS SAT, AI, ASCII Text, BMP, CATIA v4, CGM, CO (native), Drawing board, DWG/DXF, EPS, Facet, GIF, Grid Surface, IGS (IGES), JPEG, Parasolid XT, 2D & 3D PDF, PICT, PNG, PPM, Pro/E, RAW Triangle, Shockwave 3D, STP (STEP), STL, VRML, XBM, XPM	$2,495 buy, or $995/year rent, or $94.95/month rent
Creo by Parametric Technology Corporation	2D/3D hybrid	POSIX (some)	Creo 12.0	2025-06-04	Proprietary	Yes	en, fr, de, es, it, ja, ko, zh-Hant, zh-Hans (at release date)	No	No	Yes	STEP, IGES, DXF, DWG, Parasolid, STL, SAT, more	STEP, IGES, DXF, DWG, Parasolid, STL, SAT, more	$4,995, $1,500 maintenance
Creo by Parametric Technology Corporation	2D/3D hybrid	Windows	Creo 12.0	2025-06-04	Proprietary	Yes	en, fr, de, es, it, ja, ko, zh-Hant, zh-Hans (at release date)	No	No	Yes	STEP, IGES, DXF, DWG, Parasolid, STL, SAT, more	STEP, IGES, DXF, DWG, Parasolid, STL, SAT, more	$4,995, $1,500 maintenance
DataCAD by DATACAD LLC	2D/3D AEC	Windows	19	2016–10	Proprietary	US$49	en, pt, cs, et, fi, fr, de, hu, he, it, ru, es, and others	No	No	Yes	DWG, DXF, SketchUp, TXT, WMF, EMF, o2c, ACO, 3DS, STL, BMP, JPEG, GIF, TIFF, Targa, PNG, PCX, PCD, and others	DWG, DXF, DWF, SketchUp, TXT, WMF, EMF, o2c, ACO, 3DS, STL, BMP, JPEG, TIFF, Targa, PNG, PCX, EPS, PCD, PRN, PDF, VRML, RAY, and others	$1,295 First, $495 Additional, $395 Upgrade
DesignSpark Mechanical by RS Components	2D/3D hybrid	Windows	2.0.1	2015-11-18	Proprietary	Yes	en, cz, de, es, fr, it, jp, kr, pl, pt, zh-cn, zh-tw	No	No	Yes	ECAD (IDF, IDB, EMN), OBJ, Point curve text files (TXT), SKP, STL, STEP (read-only)	AMF, DXF, OBJ, 3D PDF, SKP, STL, XAML, JPEG, PNG	No cost base package
Digital Project by Gehry Technologies	2D/3D/4D AEC	Windows; 32-bit and 64-bit	Version R5	2013	Proprietary	Unknown	en	Yes	v2x3	Yes(2D + 3D)	SDNF, DWG, DXF, IFC, IGES, HSF, 3DXML	SDNF, DWG, DXF, IFC, IGES, HSF, 3DXML	?
FINE MEP by 4M	2D/3D, BIM, MEP design	Windows	v. 14	2014	Proprietary	Yes	en, fr, tr, gr, bg	Yes	v2x3)	Yes	DXF, DWG, IFC, ACIS, BMP, JPG, TGA, GIF	DXF, DWG, IFC, ACIS, Collada, 3DS, PDF, BLD, JPG, BMP, TGA, PNG, TIFF	$1,220, $720
FreeCAD	3D	Unix-like OSes; Packages for FreeBSD, Linux	1.1.0	2026-03-25	LGPL-2.0-or-later	Yes; No cost	en, af, cn, hr, nl, fi, fr, de, it, no, pt, ru, es, se, ua	Yes	version?	Yes	IFC, IGES, STEP, BRep, OBJ, DXF, SVG, U3D	IFC, IGES, STEP, BRep, OBJ, DXF, SVG, U3D	No cost
FreeCAD	3D	Windows	1.1.0	2026-03-25	LGPL-2.0-or-later	Yes; No cost	en, af, cn, hr, nl, fi, fr, de, it, no, pt, ru, es, se, ua	Yes	version?	Yes	IFC, IGES, STEP, BRep, OBJ, DXF, SVG, U3D	IFC, IGES, STEP, BRep, OBJ, DXF, SVG, U3D	No cost
FreeCAD	3D	Others with OpenGL as a prerequisite	1.1.0	2026-03-25	LGPL-2.0-or-later	Yes; No cost	en, af, cn, hr, nl, fi, fr, de, it, no, pt, ru, es, se, ua	Yes	version?	Yes	IFC, IGES, STEP, BRep, OBJ, DXF, SVG, U3D	IFC, IGES, STEP, BRep, OBJ, DXF, SVG, U3D	No cost
form•Z by AutoDesSys, Inc	2D/3D AEC rendering	macOS	6.6	2008-06-23	Proprietary	Unknown	en, fr, de, el, it, ja, ko, es	Yes	Unknown	Yes	ACIS SAT, Art·Lantis, BMP, DAE, DEM Data, DWG, DXF, EPS, FACT, GIF, HPGL, IGES, Illustrator, JPEG, Keyhole Markup Language, Lightwave, Lightscape, OBJ, PDF, PICT, Piranesi, PNG, QTVR, RIB, SGI, SketchUp, STEP, STL, TGA, TIFF, ZPR	ACIS SAT, Artlantis, BMP, DAE, DEM Data, DWG, DXF, EPS, FACT, GIF, HPGL, IGES, Illustrator, JPEG, Keyhole Markup Language, Lightwave, Lightscape, OBJ, PDF, PICT, Piranesi, PNG, QTVR, RIB, SGI, STEP, STL, TGA, TIFF, ZPR	$1,995
form•Z by AutoDesSys, Inc	2D/3D AEC rendering	Windows; XP, Vista; 32-bit and 64-bit	6.6	2008-06-23	Proprietary	Unknown	en, fr, de, el, it, ja, ko, es	Yes	Unknown	Yes	ACIS SAT, Art·Lantis, BMP, DAE, DEM Data, DWG, DXF, EPS, FACT, GIF, HPGL, IGES, Illustrator, JPEG, Keyhole Markup Language, Lightwave, Lightscape, OBJ, PDF, PICT, Piranesi, PNG, QTVR, RIB, SGI, SketchUp, STEP, STL, TGA, TIFF, ZPR	ACIS SAT, Artlantis, BMP, DAE, DEM Data, DWG, DXF, EPS, FACT, GIF, HPGL, IGES, Illustrator, JPEG, Keyhole Markup Language, Lightwave, Lightscape, OBJ, PDF, PICT, Piranesi, PNG, QTVR, RIB, SGI, STEP, STL, TGA, TIFF, ZPR	$1,995
HiCAD by ISD Group	2D/3D	Windows	2026	2025-10-30	Proprietary	Yes	en, de, it, fr, pl, jp (at release date)	Yes	version?	Yes	IGES, STEP, DXF, DWG, IFC, ACIS, ProE, SolidWorks, CATIA (V4/V5), Parasolid, UniGraphics, Inventor, IFC, PC-Draft, Technovision, Procad, Proren, Babcad, ME10, JT, STL, DSTV, SDNF	IGES, STEP, DXF, DWG, IFC, ACIS, ProE, CATIA (V4/V5), Parasolid, IFC, VRML, STL, JT, Gamma-Ray, STL, DSTV, Tops Geo, SDNF	Depends on modules acquired
IntelliCAD by IntelliCAD Technology Consortium	2D/3D AEC BIM	Windows	V 10.0a	2020-10-29	Proprietary	Varies by vendor	en (more options vary by vendor)	Yes	version?	Yes	DXF, DWF, SAT, DXB, DWT, DGN, DAE, IGES, STEP, OBJ, STL, IFC, RVT/RFA	DWF, DGN, SVG, PDF, SAT, BMP, EMF/WMF, STL, DAE	Varies by vendor
IRONCAD by IronCAD LLC	2D/3D hybrid	Windows	2023	2022-12-19	Proprietary	From US$124	en, jp, ko, de (at release date)	No	No	Yes	DXF, DWG, Parasolid, IGES, STEP, SAT, STL, ProE, Solid Edge, Inventor, Rhino (3dm), Catia	DXF, DWG, Parasolid, IGES, STEP, SAT, STL, u3d, VRML, 3dxml, Catia, PDF	$3,970, $1,295/yr for optional support
KeyCreator by Kubotek	3D direct modeling, mechanical, drafting	Windows	2021 SP1	2021-03-17	Proprietary	Yes	en, jp, it, de (at release date)	Yes	Yes	Yes	STEP, IGES, SAT, Parasolid, DXF, DWG, Catia, Creo/ProE, NX, Solid Edge, JT, SolidWorks, Inventor, CADKEY, IFC, STL, U3D, OBJ	STEP, IGES, SAT, Parasolid, DXF, DWG, STL, U3D, OBJ, VRML, WMF, HPGL, PDF	$3,495 - $5,995 permanent license w/1st year maintenance, $1,188 - $2,028/yr lease (USD)
LibreCAD	2D	POSIX	2.2.1.6	2026-10-17	GPL-2.0-only	Yes; No cost	en, fr, it, de, es, ja, zh, fi, cs, pt, lv	No	No	Yes	DWG, DXF	DXF, JPEG, PNG, SVG, BMP	No cost
LibreCAD	2D	Windows	2.2.1.6	2026-10-17	GPL-2.0-only	Yes; No cost	en, fr, it, de, es, ja, zh, fi, cs, pt, lv	No	No	Yes	DWG, DXF	DXF, JPEG, PNG, SVG, BMP	No cost
LibreCAD	2D	Others	2.2.1.6	2026-10-17	GPL-2.0-only	Yes; No cost	en, fr, it, de, es, ja, zh, fi, cs, pt, lv	No	No	Yes	DWG, DXF	DXF, JPEG, PNG, SVG, BMP	No cost
MicroStation by Bentley Systems	2D/3D AEC	Windows	CONNECT Edition (Update 9)	2017-01-17	Proprietary	Yes	en, fr, it, de, es, ja, zh, ru, tu, pl, pt, ko, fi, cs	Yes	v2x3	Yes	DGN, DGNlib, RDL, DXF, DWG, FBX, OBJ, 3DS, SKP, 3DM, JT, Mapinfo MIF/MID, imodel, RFA, IFC, SHP, TAB, IGES, Parasolid, CGM, STEP, STL, Terrain Land XML, ACIS .SAT, 3DM, STL	DGN, DXF, DWG, U3D, PDF, .dae|Collada, FBX, JT, KML, LXO, SVG, VRML, VOB, ACIS, OBJ, STL, gbXML, IGES, STEP, SKP	$5,050
MicroStation by Bentley Systems	2D/3D AEC	Other systems dropped (last was V 5.7 of 1997/1998)	CONNECT Edition (Update 9)	2017-01-17	Proprietary	Yes	en, fr, it, de, es, ja, zh, ru, tu, pl, pt, ko, fi, cs	Yes	v2x3	Yes	DGN, DGNlib, RDL, DXF, DWG, FBX, OBJ, 3DS, SKP, 3DM, JT, Mapinfo MIF/MID, imodel, RFA, IFC, SHP, TAB, IGES, Parasolid, CGM, STEP, STL, Terrain Land XML, ACIS .SAT, 3DM, STL	DGN, DXF, DWG, U3D, PDF, .dae|Collada, FBX, JT, KML, LXO, SVG, VRML, VOB, ACIS, OBJ, STL, gbXML, IGES, STEP, SKP	$5,050
NX by Siemens Digital Industries Software	2D/3D, parametric	macOS	11.0	2016-06-29	Proprietary	Unknown	en, fr, it, de, es, ja, zh, fi, cs	Unknown	Unknown	Yes	JT, Parasolid, STEP, DWG, DXF, ProE, SolidWorks, I-deas, CATIA (V4/V5), STL, IGES	JT, Parasolid, STEP, DWG, DXF, ProE, SolidWorks, I-deas, CATIA (V4/V5), STL, IGES	$12k - $40k
NX by Siemens Digital Industries Software	2D/3D, parametric	Red Hat Linux	11.0	2016-06-29	Proprietary	Unknown	en, fr, it, de, es, ja, zh, fi, cs	Unknown	Unknown	Yes	JT, Parasolid, STEP, DWG, DXF, ProE, SolidWorks, I-deas, CATIA (V4/V5), STL, IGES	JT, Parasolid, STEP, DWG, DXF, ProE, SolidWorks, I-deas, CATIA (V4/V5), STL, IGES	$12k - $40k
NX by Siemens Digital Industries Software	2D/3D, parametric	SUSE Linux	11.0	2016-06-29	Proprietary	Unknown	en, fr, it, de, es, ja, zh, fi, cs	Unknown	Unknown	Yes	JT, Parasolid, STEP, DWG, DXF, ProE, SolidWorks, I-deas, CATIA (V4/V5), STL, IGES	JT, Parasolid, STEP, DWG, DXF, ProE, SolidWorks, I-deas, CATIA (V4/V5), STL, IGES	$12k - $40k
NX by Siemens Digital Industries Software	2D/3D, parametric	Windows	11.0	2016-06-29	Proprietary	Unknown	en, fr, it, de, es, ja, zh, fi, cs	Unknown	Unknown	Yes	JT, Parasolid, STEP, DWG, DXF, ProE, SolidWorks, I-deas, CATIA (V4/V5), STL, IGES	JT, Parasolid, STEP, DWG, DXF, ProE, SolidWorks, I-deas, CATIA (V4/V5), STL, IGES	$12k - $40k
Onshape by PTC	Mechanical CAD (MCAD), 3D printing	Web browser	1.143	2022-02-18	Proprietary, some parts MIT	Yes; No cost	en, de, ko, zh-Hant, zh-Hans, fr, ja, it, es	Unknown	Unknown	Yes	DWG, DXF, Parasolid mesh (.xmm_txt or .xmm_bin), ACIS (.sat), STEP (.stpor .step), IGES (.igs or .iges), CATIA, SolidWorks (.sldprt), Inventor, Pro/E, JT (.jt), Rhino (.3dm), STL (.stl), OBJ (.obj), NXSolid Edge (.par and .psm)	DWG, DXF, DWT, SVG, PNG, JPEG, Parasolid mesh (.xmm_txt or .xmm_bin), ACIS (.sat), STEP (.stpor .step), IGES (.igs or .iges), SolidWorks (.sldprt), JT (.jt), Rhino (.3dm), STL (.stl), OBJ (.obj), GlTF (.gltf), COLLADA, PDF, PVZ (.pvz)	No cost for education and Hobbyists/Open Source, $1500 - $2100 for Commercial Use, Contact for Enterprise Version
Onshape by PTC	Mechanical CAD (MCAD), 3D printing	Android	1.143	2022-02-18	Proprietary, some parts MIT	Yes; No cost	en, de, ko, zh-Hant, zh-Hans, fr, ja, it, es	Unknown	Unknown	Yes	DWG, DXF, Parasolid mesh (.xmm_txt or .xmm_bin), ACIS (.sat), STEP (.stpor .step), IGES (.igs or .iges), CATIA, SolidWorks (.sldprt), Inventor, Pro/E, JT (.jt), Rhino (.3dm), STL (.stl), OBJ (.obj), NXSolid Edge (.par and .psm)	DWG, DXF, DWT, SVG, PNG, JPEG, Parasolid mesh (.xmm_txt or .xmm_bin), ACIS (.sat), STEP (.stpor .step), IGES (.igs or .iges), SolidWorks (.sldprt), JT (.jt), Rhino (.3dm), STL (.stl), OBJ (.obj), GlTF (.gltf), COLLADA, PDF, PVZ (.pvz)	No cost for education and Hobbyists/Open Source, $1500 - $2100 for Commercial Use, Contact for Enterprise Version
Onshape by PTC	Mechanical CAD (MCAD), 3D printing	iOS	1.143	2022-02-18	Proprietary, some parts MIT	Yes; No cost	en, de, ko, zh-Hant, zh-Hans, fr, ja, it, es	Unknown	Unknown	Yes	DWG, DXF, Parasolid mesh (.xmm_txt or .xmm_bin), ACIS (.sat), STEP (.stpor .step), IGES (.igs or .iges), CATIA, SolidWorks (.sldprt), Inventor, Pro/E, JT (.jt), Rhino (.3dm), STL (.stl), OBJ (.obj), NXSolid Edge (.par and .psm)	DWG, DXF, DWT, SVG, PNG, JPEG, Parasolid mesh (.xmm_txt or .xmm_bin), ACIS (.sat), STEP (.stpor .step), IGES (.igs or .iges), SolidWorks (.sldprt), JT (.jt), Rhino (.3dm), STL (.stl), OBJ (.obj), GlTF (.gltf), COLLADA, PDF, PVZ (.pvz)	No cost for education and Hobbyists/Open Source, $1500 - $2100 for Commercial Use, Contact for Enterprise Version
OpenSCAD	2D/3D	POSIX (BSD–Linux–Unix like OS), Packages for Linux	2021.01	2021-01-31	GPL-2.0-or-later	Yes; No cost	en	No	No	Partial	DXF, STL, OFF	PNG, DXF, STL, OFF, AMF, 3MF, SVG, CSG, PDF	No cost
OpenSCAD	2D/3D	macOS	2021.01	2021-01-31	GPL-2.0-or-later	Yes; No cost	en	No	No	Partial	DXF, STL, OFF	PNG, DXF, STL, OFF, AMF, 3MF, SVG, CSG, PDF	No cost
OpenSCAD	2D/3D	Windows	2021.01	2021-01-31	GPL-2.0-or-later	Yes; No cost	en	No	No	Partial	DXF, STL, OFF	PNG, DXF, STL, OFF, AMF, 3MF, SVG, CSG, PDF	No cost
OrthoGraph	2D/3D	Android	3.1.2	2020-05-08	Proprietary	No	en, fr, de, hu, it, ja, nl, ru, es	Yes	version?	Yes		PNG, DXF, JPG, IFC	$29.99 per month
OrthoGraph	2D/3D	iOS	3.1.2	2020-05-08	Proprietary	No	en, fr, de, hu, it, ja, nl, ru, es	Yes	version?	Yes		PNG, DXF, JPG, IFC	$29.99 per month
PowerCADD by Engineered Software	2D	macOS	v9	2010–08	Proprietary	No	en, fr, it, es, ...	No	No	Yes	DWG, DXF, PDF, EPSF, PS, Bitmap, VectorPict, JPG, PNG, TIF, SGI, TGA, Adobe Photoshop, *SHP, *GPX, ASCII Topo Survey (*with WildTools)	DXF, DWG, PDF, EPSF, PS, Bitmap, VectorPict, JPG, PNG, TIF, SGI, TGA, Adobe Photoshop,	$995(PRO)-$1250(expert incl WildTools)
QCAD by Ribbon Soft	2D	POSIX	3.33.1.0	2026-09-08	GPL-3.0-or-later	Yes	en	Yes	v2.x3 import and export	Yes	IFC, DXF, DWG	IFC, DXF, DWG	No cost, $42 for Commercial
QCAD by Ribbon Soft	2D	macOS	3.33.1.0	2026-09-08	GPL-3.0-or-later	Yes	en	Yes	v2.x3 import and export	Yes	IFC, DXF, DWG	IFC, DXF, DWG	No cost, $42 for Commercial
QCAD by Ribbon Soft	2D	Windows	3.33.1.0	2026-09-08	GPL-3.0-or-later	Yes	en	Yes	v2.x3 import and export	Yes	IFC, DXF, DWG	IFC, DXF, DWG	No cost, $42 for Commercial
Autodesk Revit	2D/3D BIM AEC	Windows	2024.1	2023-07-11	Proprietary	Yes	pt-BR, en, cs, fr, de, hu, it, ja, ko, ru, zh-Hans, es	Yes	version? Import and export certified	Yes	DXF, DWG, SAT, SKP, DGN, JPEG, PNG, TIFF	DWG, DXF, SAT, FBX, IFC, DGN, DWF, JPEG, PNG, TIFF, AVI, PDF	Varies
Rhinoceros 3D by Robert McNeel and Associates	2D/3D CAD	macOS	Rhino 8 SR8.8.24	2024-06-18	Proprietary	Yes	en, fr, de, it, es, pl, cs, zh, ja, kr	Unknown	Unknown	Yes	DXF, DWG, .3ds, SAT, SketchUp, IGES, STEP, STL, DGN, FBX, OBJ, sldprt	DXF, DWG, .3ds, SAT, SketchUp, IGES, STEP, STL, COLLADA, Parasolid	$995
Rhinoceros 3D by Robert McNeel and Associates	2D/3D CAD	Windows	Rhino 8 SR8.8.24	2024-06-18	Proprietary	Yes	en, fr, de, it, es, pl, cs, zh, ja, kr	Unknown	Unknown	Yes	DXF, DWG, .3ds, SAT, SketchUp, IGES, STEP, STL, DGN, FBX, OBJ, sldprt	DXF, DWG, .3ds, SAT, SketchUp, IGES, STEP, STL, COLLADA, Parasolid	$995
Salome	CAE	Linux	9.15.0	2025-09	LGPL-2.1-or-later	Yes; No cost	EN, FR, JA	Unknown	Unknown	No	BREP, IGES, STEP, XAO	IGES, STEP, BREP, STL, MED, UNV, DAT, XAO	No cost
Salome	CAE	FreeBSD	9.15.0	2025-09	LGPL-2.1-or-later	Yes; No cost	EN, FR, JA	Unknown	Unknown	No	BREP, IGES, STEP, XAO	IGES, STEP, BREP, STL, MED, UNV, DAT, XAO	No cost
Salome	CAE	Windows	9.15.0	2025-09	LGPL-2.1-or-later	Yes; No cost	EN, FR, JA	Unknown	Unknown	No	BREP, IGES, STEP, XAO	IGES, STEP, BREP, STL, MED, UNV, DAT, XAO	No cost
SketchUp by Trimble	3D	macOS	18.0.16976	2017-11-14	Proprietary	Yes	EN, FR, IT, DE, ES, PT(BR), JA, KO, ZH(CN), ZH(TW)	Yes	import and export, version?	Yes	DWG, DXF, DEM, DDF, 3DS, DAE, KMZ, IFC, JPG, PNG, PSD, TIF, TGA, BMP	DAE, KMZ, 3DS, DWG, DXF, FBX, OBJ, WRL, XSI, PDF, EPS, BMP, JPG, TIF, PNG, EPX,	SketchUp Make: No cost SketchUp Pro: $700
SketchUp by Trimble	3D	Windows	18.0.16975	2017-11-14	Proprietary	Yes	EN, FR, IT, DE, ES, PT(BR), JA, KO, ZH(CN), ZH(TW)	Yes	import and export, version?	Yes	DWG, DXF, DEM, DDF, 3DS, DAE, KMZ, IFC, JPG, PNG, PSD, TIF, TGA, BMP	DAE, KMZ, 3DS, DWG, DXF, FBX, OBJ, WRL, XSI, PDF, EPS, BMP, JPG, TIF, PNG, EPX,	SketchUp Make: No cost SketchUp Pro: $700
Solid Edge by Siemens Digital Industries Software	2D/3D	Windows	Solid Edge 2023	2022–10	Proprietary	Yes; No cost	en, es, ru, fr, ko (at release date)	Unknown	No	Yes	IGES, STEP, DXF, JT, ACIS (SAT), ProE, SolidWorks, NX, SDRC, Microstation, Inventor, CATIA (V4/V5), Parasolid, Autocad, STL, XML, MDS	IGES, STEP, STL, PDF, EMS, JT, XGL, XML, DXF, Parasolid, CATIA (V4/V5), ACIS (SAT), Microstation, Autocad	Community Edition: No cost Commercial: $5,300, $1,200 maintenance
SolidWorks by Dassault Systèmes	2D/3D hybrid	Windows	2023 SP3	2023-07-10	Proprietary	From US$12,995	en, es, de, fr (at release date)	Yes	import: ifc2x3, export: ifc4.0	Yes	DXF, DWG, DXF, Parasolid, IGES, STEP, ACIS (SAT), STL, ProE, Creo, Solid Edge, Siemens NX, Autodesk Inventor, Adobe Photoshop, Adobe Illustrator, Rhino (3dm), IDF (emn, brd, bdf, idb, idx), VDA, WRL, Meshfiles (stl, obj, off, ply, ply2), 3MF, CGR, catpart/catproduct, Rhino (3dm), JT, sldxml, IFC	DXF, DWG, Parasolid, IGES, STEP, ACIS (SAT), STL, u3d, VRML, 3dxml, Catia, PDF, IFC,	$9.99/mth or $99/yr for hobbyists – makers, $3,995 for commercial, $1,295/yr for optional support
SolveSpace by Jonathan Westhues	2D/3D parametric	Linux	3.3	2026-10-21	GPL-3.0-or-later	Yes; No cost	en, de, es, fr, ru, ja, tr, uk, zh-Hans, cs	No	No	Export only		2D as DXF, EPS, PDF, SVG, HPGL, STEP; 3D wireframe as DXF, STEP; triangle mesh as STL, Wavefront OBJ, HTML (Three.js); NURBS surfaces as STEP	No cost
SolveSpace by Jonathan Westhues	2D/3D parametric	macOS	3.3	2026-10-21	GPL-3.0-or-later	Yes; No cost	en, de, es, fr, ru, ja, tr, uk, zh-Hans, cs	No	No	Export only		2D as DXF, EPS, PDF, SVG, HPGL, STEP; 3D wireframe as DXF, STEP; triangle mesh as STL, Wavefront OBJ, HTML (Three.js); NURBS surfaces as STEP	No cost
SolveSpace by Jonathan Westhues	2D/3D parametric	Windows	3.3	2026-10-21	GPL-3.0-or-later	Yes; No cost	en, de, es, fr, ru, ja, tr, uk, zh-Hans, cs	No	No	Export only		2D as DXF, EPS, PDF, SVG, HPGL, STEP; 3D wireframe as DXF, STEP; triangle mesh as STL, Wavefront OBJ, HTML (Three.js); NURBS surfaces as STEP	No cost
SpaceClaim Engineer by Ansys, Inc.	2D/3D hybrid	Windows	Ansys 2023 R2	2023-07-05	Proprietary	Unknown	en	Unknown	Unknown	Yes	DXF, DWG, Parasolid, IGES, STEP, ACIS, STL, ProE, Solid Edge, VRML, OBJ, STL, NX, CATIA, Solidworks, Rhinoceros	[ACIS], Acrobat PDF 3D, Acrobat - PDF 2D, AutoCAD - DWG and DXF, CATIA V5, [IGES], JT Open, Keyshot, Parasolid, POV-Ray, PowerPoint, Rhino, SketchUp, [STEP], STL, VDA-VS, VRML, OBJ, XAML, XPS	?
Tekla Structures by Trimble	3D/4D/5D, steel detailing, concrete detailing	Windows	Version 2025 SR 4	2024-09-13	Proprietary	Yes	en, cs, zh-Hans, zh-Hant, du, fr, de, hu, it, ja, ko, pl, pt, pt-BR, ru, es	Yes	Import and export IFC2x3 IFC4 IFC4.3 Export certified.	Yes	IFC, IFCXML, IFCZIP, DWG, DXF, DGN, PDF, STEP, IGES, CIS/2, ISM, FabTrol KISS, DSTV, Steel Detailing Neutral Format, Eliplan ELI, Primavera P6, Trimble LM80 3D geometry definition file format (.obj) - Adobe PDF (.pdf) - Autodesk 3DS Max format (.3ds) - AutoCAD (.dwg)(.dxf) - BIM Collaboration format (.bcf) - Blender files (.blend) - Collada (.dae) - Conversion files (.cnv) - Comma separated value files (.csv) - DSTV (.nc, .stp, .mis) - Elematic ELiPLAN, ELiPOS, Plant Control, FloorMES, WallMES (.eli) - FabTrol MIS Xml (.xml) - Filmbox (.fbx) - GL Transmission Format (.glft) - IFC2x3 IFC4 IFC4.3 (.ifc) - IFCXML 2X3 (.ifcXML) - IFCZIP 2x3 (.ifcZIP) - Initial Graphics Exchange Specification (IGES) (.iges, .igs) - LandXML (.xml) - Microsoft Project (.xml) - Microstation (.dgn) - Oracle Primavera P6 (.xml) - Point cloud (.e57, .las, .laz, .pts, .ptx, .js, .tzf, .tdx) - Polygon File Format (.ply) - Potree (.js) - SketchUp (.skp) - Staad ASCII (.std) - Steel Detailing Neutral Format (.sdf, .sdnf, .dat) - STEP AP203 (.stp, .step) - STEP AP214 (.stp, .step) - TrimBIM (.tekla) - Tekla Collaboration (.tczip) - Tekla PowerFab (.pftx, .zip) - Tekla Structural Designer model (.tsmd) - Tekla Structural Designer neutral (.cxl) - Tekla Structures shape (.tsc) - TrimBIM (.trb) - Trimble Field Link (.tfl, .tflx, .txt, .cnx)	IFC, IFCXML, IFCZIP, DWG, DXF, DGN, CIS/2, ISM, FabTrol KISS, DSTV, Steel Detailing Neutral Format, Eliplan ELI, Primavera P6, Trimble LM80, HMS 3D geometry definition file format (.obj) - aSa (.TEK) - Adobe PDF (.pdf) - AutoCAD (.dwg)(.dxf) - BIM Collaboration format (.bcf) - BVBS (.abs) - Collada (.dae) - Conversion files (.cnv) - Comma separated value files (.csv) - DSTV (.nc, .stp, .mis) - Elematic ELiPLAN, ELiPOS, Plant Control, FloorMES, WallMES (.eli) - FabTrol Kiss (.kss) - FabTrol MIS Xml (.xml) - HMS (.sot) - IBB Betsy (.fa, .f, .ev) - IFC2x3 IFC4 IFC4.3 (.ifc) - IFCXML 2X3 (.ifcXML) - IFCZIP 2x3 (.ifcZIP) - Initial Graphics Exchange Specification (IGES) (.iges, .igs) - Microsoft Project (.xml) - Microstation (.dgn) - Oracle Primavera P6 (.xml) - Plant Design Management System (.pdms) - Potree (.js) - RIB iTWO-Export (.cpixml) - SketchUp (.skp) - Staad ASCII (.std) - Steel Detailing Neutral Format (.sdf, .sdnf, .dat) - TrimBIM (.tekla) - Tekla Collaboration (.tczip) - Tekla PowerFab (.pftx, .zip) - Tekla-FabTrol Report (.xsr) - Tekla Structural Designer model (.tsmd) - Tekla Structural Designer neutral (.cxl) - Tekla Structures shape (.tsc) - TrimBIM (.trb) - Trimble Field Link (.tfl, .tflx, .txt, .cnx) - TubeNC (.xml) - Unitechnik (.uni, .cam)	No cost for education - Price change related to Tekla Structures subscription Diamond - for detailing and production documentation Graphite - for modeling and design documentation Carbon - for viewing and collaboration
Tinkercad by Autodesk	3D modeling, constructive solid geometry	POSIX		2019	Proprietary	No	Browser default	No	No	Unknown	SVG, STL, OBJ	STL, OBJ	No cost
Tinkercad by Autodesk	3D modeling, constructive solid geometry	Windows		2019	Proprietary	No	Browser default	No	No	Unknown	SVG, STL, OBJ	STL, OBJ	No cost
Tinkercad by Autodesk	3D modeling, constructive solid geometry	Others		2019	Proprietary	No	Browser default	No	No	Unknown	SVG, STL, OBJ	STL, OBJ	No cost
T-FLEX CAD by Top Systems Ltd.	2D/3D parametric	Windows	Version 17.0.74.0	2022-06-14	Proprietary	Yes	en, ru, de, pl, cs, it, ko	Yes	Version?	Yes	DWG, DXF, DXB, Parasolid, STEP, IGES, ACIS, SolidWork, Autodesk Inventor, Siemens NX (Unigraphics), CATIA (V4/V5), Creo (ProE), Solid Edge, Rhino, VDA-FS, JT, PRC, 3dxml, CGR, U3D, IFC, TF3D, Open Inventor, VRML, X3D, 3DS, PLY, OBJ, STL.	2D documents: PDF, DXF, DXB, DWG, EMF, WMF, BMF 3D documents: Parasolid, STEP, IGES, ACIS, JT, PRC 3D documents with mesh (polygonal) geometry: DXF 3D, STL, OBJ, PLY, VRML 2.0, 3D PDF, U3D, X3D, 3DM, POV, Open Inventor, IFC, 3MF Raster images: BMP, JPEG, PNG, GIF, TIFF	-
TransMagic	File translator	Windows; XP, Vista, 7	R11	2014	Proprietary	No	en, de	No	No	Yes	CATIA V4, CATIA V5, Autodesk Inventor, Pro/E, Solidworks SLDPTR/SLDASM, Unigraphics, ACIS (.sat, .sab, .asf, .asat, .asab), JT, Parasolid, IGES, STEP (.stp), HOOPS Meta File, HOOPS Streaming File (.hsf), PLY, STL, OBJ, Large file support	CATIA V4, CATIA V5, ACIS (.sat, .sab, .asf, .asat, .asab), JT, Parasolid (.x_t, .x_b, .xmt_txt, .xmb_txt), IGES, STEP (.stp), HOOPS Meta File, HOOPS Streaming File (.hsf), NGRAIN, PLY, STL, HTML, OBJ, Enhanced Metafile, PDF, PostScript, TIFF, BMP, Large file support	?
TurboCAD by IMSI/Design, LLC	2D/3D	macOS	2017 Mac V10	2018-04-30	Proprietary	Up to 85% off standard pricing	en, cs, de, es, ja, fr, pl, zh-Hant	Yes	Version?	Yes			$1,495 Pro, $1,695 Pro Platinum
TurboCAD by IMSI/Design, LLC	2D/3D	Windows	V2018	2018-04-30	Proprietary	Up to 85% off standard pricing	en, cs, de, es, ja, fr, pl, zh-Hant	Yes	Version?	Yes			$1,495 Pro, $1,695 Pro Platinum
VariCAD by VariCAD	2D/3D parametric	Linux	20123–2.0	2023-03-21	Proprietary	Yes	en, de, cs, pt, ja	Unknown	Unknown	Yes	STEP (3D), DWG (2D), DXF (2D), DWB	STEP (3D), STL (3D), IGES (3D), BMP (from 3D), DWG (2D), DXF (2D), DWB	$780
VariCAD by VariCAD	2D/3D parametric	Windows	20123–2.0	2023-03-21	Proprietary	Yes	en, de, cs, pt, ja	Unknown	Unknown	Yes	STEP (3D), DWG (2D), DXF (2D), DWB	STEP (3D), STL (3D), IGES (3D), BMP (from 3D), DWG (2D), DXF (2D), DWB	$780
VisualARQ by Asuni CAD S.A.	2D/3D	Windows	1.9.7	2017-05-03	Proprietary	$95	en, fr, es, de, it, cs	Yes	Version?	Yes	3DM, 3DS, AI, DGN, DWG, DXF, EPS, FBX, GDF, IGS/IGES, LWO, OBJ, PDF, PLY, SLDPTR/SLDASM, SKP, STL, STP/STEP, VDA, VRML/VRL, X, ZPR	3DM, 3DS, ACIS, AI, DGN, X, DWG, DXF, EPS, FBX, GDF, IGS/IGES, IFC, LWO, OBJ, PDF, PLY, POV, RIB, SKP, SDLPTR/SDLASM, STL, STP/STEP, VDA, VRML/VRL, WMF, X_T, XGL, ZPR	$495
ZWCAD by ZWSOFT	2D	Windows	2026	2025-05-14	Proprietary	No	en, ja, de, fr, it, es, pt, ko, pl, tr, cs, hu, zh-Hans, zh-Hant, ru	No	Yes	Yes	DWG 2.5 to 2018, DXF, DWF, ACIS SAT, BMP, JPEG, PNG, TIF, TIFF, PDF, WMF, DGN, SXF, IFC, STEP (.stp), JWW	DWG 2.5 to 2018, DXF, DWF, ACIS SAT, BMP, JPEG, PNG, TIF, TIFF, PDF, WMF, DGN, SXF, STL, CAL, TGA, PCX, GIF, RLC, BIL, PCT	ZWCAD STD: $899 ZWCAD PRO: $1,399 ZWCAD MFG: $1,699
Title and developer	2D/3D or specialty fields	Platform	Latest release		License	Academic version?	User interface languages	Support for building information modelling?	Support for Industry Foundation Classes (version & MVD)?	Support for AutoCAD DXF?	Imports	Exports	Price (USD)
Title and developer	2D/3D or specialty fields	Platform	Version	Date	License	Academic version?	User interface languages	Support for building information modelling?	Support for Industry Foundation Classes (version & MVD)?	Support for AutoCAD DXF?	Imports	Exports	Price (USD)

== See also ==
- 3D scanning
- CAD/CAM in the footwear industry
- Comparison of 3D computer graphics software
- Comparison of CAD, CAM, and CAE file viewers
- Comparison of EDA software
- Comparison of free software for audio
- List of 3D computer graphics software
- List of 3D modeling software
- List of 3D rendering software
- List of computer-aided engineering software
- List of free and open-source software packages
- List of video editing software
