= ABViewer =

Multifunctional software for working with CAD files

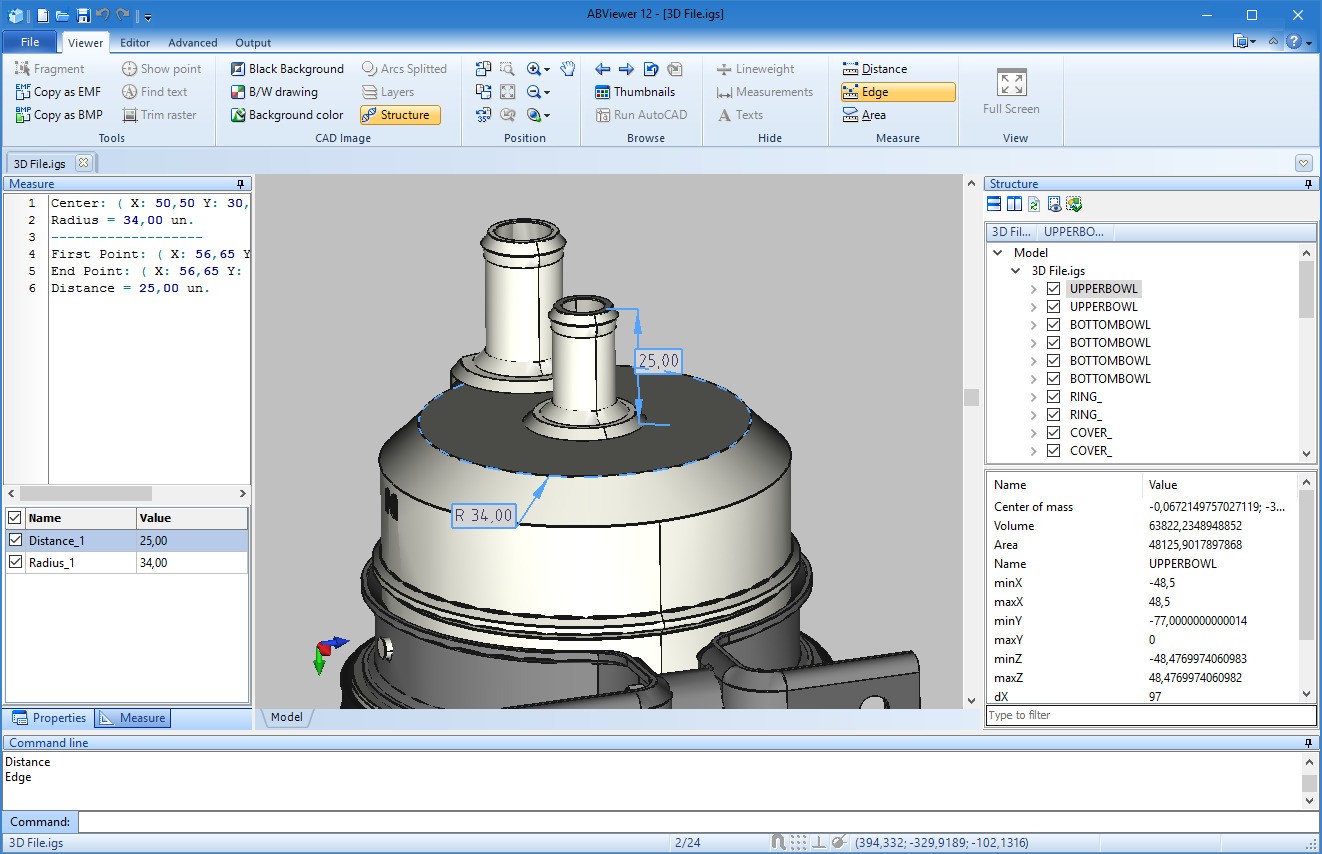
- Measuring a 3D model in ABViewer 12 (Windows 10)
- Developer: CADSoftTools
- Release: 2003; 23 years ago
- Stable release: 16 / November 14, 2025; 9 months ago
- Operating system: Microsoft Windows, Linux with Wine
- Available in: English, German, French, Russian, other
- Type: Computer-aided design
- License: Trialware
- Website: www.cadsofttools.com

ABViewer is a software application for 2D/3D computer-aided design (CAD) developed by CADSoftTools in 2003. Its main features are viewing, editing, creating, converting, and printing CAD files. It is compatible with Windows and Linux with Wine and distributed as proprietary software. ABViewer is available in more than 30 languages.

== History ==
The early version of ABViewer allowed viewing and merging CAD files, storing BMP and EMF images in the clipboard, and printing a group of files. Initially, the program supported 20 languages and was available in two versions: Standard and Professional.

In 2007, new features were added to the viewer: an editor and a converter. The application got a full set of editing tools for design and project work. As a converter, ABViewer made it possible to convert selected parts of the image. ABViewer 6 was available in three versions (Standard, Professional and Enterprise).

ABViewer 15.1 was released in 2023. The latest version (ABViewer 15.2) was released in October 2024.

== Features ==
- Viewer: 2D and 3D files, moving and rotating objects, various display modes
- Editor: access to layers, creating drawings from scratch, editing loaded files
- Converter: single and batch conversion
- Printing: single and batch printing
- Thumbnail window
- Redline mode
- G-code

According to the comparative study of CAD data exchange based on STEP standard held in 2017, ABViewer was able to open the exported STEP models with success rate of 80%. The representation of models was complete, without absence of model features or missing surfaces, but with low accuracy of splines with larger radius; the error visibility was decreasing with the decrease of spline radius.

== Supported formats ==
ABViewer allows viewing more than 50 vector and raster 2D and 3D formats:

Type	File Format
CAD formats	AutoCAD DWG (all versions from 2.5 to 2018 inclusive), DXF ASCII/BINARY (all versions), DWF, DXT
3D formats	3DS, SAT, STL, IGES (.igs), STEP (.stp), OBJ, X_T, X_B, SLDPRT, SLDASM, FSAT, SAB, SMT, IPT, IFC, GTS, TIN, ASE, B3D, GLM, GLX, GLA, LMTS, LWO, NURBS, NMF, OCT, PLY, VRML, MDC, MD2, MD3, MD5, SMD, BSP
Vector formats	WMF, EMF, PDF, CGM, SVG, SVGZ, EPS, PS, Hewlett-Packard HPGL (PLT, HGL, HG, HPG, PLO, HP, HP1, HP2, HP3, HPGL, HPGL2, HPP, GL, GL2, PRN, SPL, RTL, PCL)
Raster formats	GED, RLA, RPF, CEL, PIC, CAL, CG4, GP4, GIF, CUT, PAL, DDS, FAX, HDR, IFF, ICO, EXR, IMB, JPG, JPEG, J2K, J2C, JNG, JP2, KOA, PCT, PICT, MNG, PSP, PCD, PSD, PDD, PNG, PPM, PGM, PBM, RAW, G3, BW, RGB, RGBA, SGI, RAS, TIF, TIFF, TGA, VST, ICB, VDA, WIN, BMP, RLE, DIB, WAP, WBMP, WBM, XBM, XPM, PCX

The program opens archived drawings too: ZIP, 7z, RAR, CAB, BZIP, TAR.

== Localization ==
ABViewer is fully translated into the following languages: Chinese, Czech, Dutch, English, Finnish, French, German, Hebrew, Hungarian, Italian, Brazilian Portuguese, Russian, and Spanish. ABViewer documentation and detailed help system are available in English, German, French, and Russian.

== Reception ==
Ron LaFon from the Cadalyst compared nine different CAD Viewers in 2008 and AViewer v6.2 was among them. He stated that the program supported lots of languages (32 languages in total at that time), had “clean and easy to understand” user interface and a variety of available features.

The Digital Engineering magazine named ABViewer (version 7) a “cost-efficient high-quality application” that could be used by engineers as well as by office workers. The Thumbnail visualization of the folder contents was highlighted in particular as this feature makes the search for the required files considerably easier. Softpedia describes ABViewer version 14 as a modern tool that can help in a variety of tasks and is easy and user-friendly even for inexperienced users.

Apart from it ABViewer is referenced to as a tool for measuring, converting and viewing CAD files in a number of modern studies and researches in different fields.

== See also ==
- CAD
- DWG
- Comparison of computer-aided design editors
