= Comparison of CAD, CAM, and CAE file viewers =

This is an overview of notable viewers for files, that are produced by Computer-aided design (CAD), Computer-aided manufacturing (CAM) and Computer-aided engineering (CAE) applications.

== Comparison of notable CAD/CAM/CAE file viewers ==
Application	Developer	Platform	Latest release		License	3D support?	User Interface Language(s)	Supported format(s)
Application	Developer	Platform	Version	Date	License	3D support?	User Interface Language(s)	Supported format(s)
Caddie	Advanced Computer Solutions	Windows	14		Proprietary	Yes	EN	DXF, DWG, DRW
LibreCAD	LibreCAD	POSIX	2.2.1.6	2026-10-17	GPL-2.0-only	No	CN, EN, ES, FR, DE, HU, IT, JP, RU, other	DXF
LibreCAD	LibreCAD	Windows	2.2.1.6	2026-10-17	GPL-2.0-only	No	CN, EN, ES, FR, DE, HU, IT, JP, RU, other	DXF
LibreCAD	LibreCAD	Other	2.2.1.6	2026-10-17	GPL-2.0-only	No	CN, EN, ES, FR, DE, HU, IT, JP, RU, other	DXF
VariCAD Viewer	VariCAD	Linux	v2.03	2019	Proprietary	Yes	EN, DE, JP, PT, CN	DWG (2D), DXF (2D), STEP (3D)
VariCAD Viewer	VariCAD	Windows	v2.03	2019	Proprietary	Yes	EN, DE, JP, PT, CN	DWG (2D), DXF (2D), STEP (3D)
VariCAD Viewer	VariCAD	Other	v2.03	2019	Proprietary	Yes	EN, DE, JP, PT, CN	DWG (2D), DXF (2D), STEP (3D)
WorkXPlore 3D	Sescoi	Windows	1.7	2009	Proprietary	Yes	EN, FR, DE, ES, IT, JP, CN	DWG, DXF, IGES, STEP, STL, UNISURF, 3D WorkNC, XDW, Parasolid, SolidWorks, Pro/E, Catia V4, Catia V5, UGS, ISO toolpaths, CADDS, Solid Edge
HOOPS Visualize	Tech Soft 3D	Windows, Linux, MacOS, Android, Xamarin	?	2022	Proprietary	Yes	EN	PostScript, PDF, DWG, Parasolid, etc.
ABViewer	CADSoftTools	Windows, Linux with Wine	15.1	2023	Proprietary	Yes	EN, FR, DE, ES, IT, CN, RU	DWG, DXF, STEP, STL, IGES, PDF
AutoCAD	Autodesk	Windows, macOS	25.0	2024	Proprietary	Yes	EN, FR, DE, ES, IT, CN, RU, PL, KO, PT-BR	DWG, DWT, DWS, DXF
ZWCAD	ZWSOFT	Windows	2026	2026	Proprietary	Yes	EN, JP, FR, DE, ES, IT, CN, RU, PL, KO, PT, other	DWG, DXF, DWF, DWS, DWT

== See also ==
- Comparison of computer-aided design software
- List of CAD file formats
