= GenerativeComponents =

GenerativeComponents is parametric CAD software developed by Bentley Systems, was first introduced in 2003, became increasingly used in practice (especially by the London architectural community) by early 2005, and was commercially released in November 2007. GenerativeComponents has a strong traditional base of users in academia and at technologically advanced design firms. GenerativeComponents is often referred to by the nickname of 'GC'. GC epitomizes the quest to bring parametric modeling capabilities of 3D solid modeling into architectural design, seeking to provide greater fluidity and fluency than mechanical 3D solid modeling.

Users can interact with the software by either dynamically modeling and directly manipulating geometry, or by applying rules and capturing relationships among model elements, or by defining complex forms and systems through concisely expressed algorithms. The software supports many industry standard file input and outputs including DGN by Bentley Systems, DWG by Autodesk, STL (Stereo Lithography), Rhino, and others. The software can also integrate with Building Information Modeling systems, specifically and an installed extension/Companion Feature to Bentley's AECOsim Building Designer.

The software has a published API and uses a simple scripting language, both allowing the integration with many different software tools, and the creation of custom programs by users.

This software is primarily used by architects and engineers in the design of buildings, but has also been used to model natural and biological structures and mathematical systems.

Generative Components currently runs exclusively on Microsoft Windows operating systems, and in English.

Bentley Systems Incorporated offers GC as a free download. This version of GC does not time-out and is not feature limited. It requires registration with an email address. This is a standalone version of GC that includes the underlying Bentley MicroStation software that is required for it to run.

== SmartGeometry Group ==
The SmartGeometry Group has been instrumental in the formation of GenerativeComponents.

GenerativeComponents was brought to the market after utilizing a multi-year testing cycle with a dedicated user community in the SmartGeometry group. This community was responsible for shaping the product very early in its life and continues to play an important role in defining it. The SmartGeometry Group is an independent non-profit organization; it is not a Bentley user group.

The SmartGeometry Group organizes an annual multi-day workshop and accompanying conference highlighting advanced design practices and technology. Recent workshop and conferences have been in:

- Munich (2008);
- San Francisco (2009);
- IAAC - Barcelona, Spain (2010);
- CITA - Copenhagen, Denmark (2011);
- RPI - Troy, New York (2012);
- UCL - London, UK (2013);
- Hong Kong (2014);
- Gothenburg (2016);
- Toronto (2018).

== See also ==
- Architecture
- Architectural engineering
- Design computing
- Comparison of CAD Software
