= TransMagic =

TransMagic is a commercial computer program that converts computer-aided design (CAD) files from one native file format to another. During the translation process, TransMagic performs “geometry mapping”, mapping from one CAD kernel to another. During the conversion, TransMagic avoids what are known as “stitching errors” by repairing geometry via techniques such as correcting slightly overlapping or misaligned surfaces, removing duplicate control points, and duplicate vertices.

== Overview ==
An original file of a handle in Autodesk Inventor

The same file opened from within SolidWorks using the TransMagic plug-in

A large number of CAD programs are on the market, among them Autodesk Inventor, Cobalt, Form-Z, Pro/ENGINEER, and SolidWorks. With rare exceptions, each program saves data files (2D and 3D drawings and 3D solid models) in its own native file format. Since major CAD programs are expensive—several thousand dollars or more—and require great skill and time to master, it is common for individuals and companies to own just one type of program. The existence of many different file types presents no problems when engineers and designers share files within an organization that has standardized upon a common CAD program. However, file-transfer problems can arise when files must be shared with outside individuals who are using a different type of CAD program.

The typical work-around when sharing files with an outside organization is to export the file using two open-file-type standards: IGES, which was released in 1980 by the National Institute of Standards and Technology (then known as the National Bureau of Standards), and STEP, released in 1984/85. The proprietary file format DXF is also a common file format for exchange.

When a file is exported by one CAD program into an intermediate file format and opened in another CAD program, it is not unusual for translation errors to occur. This inability to reliably transfer files between disparate programs is especially problematic with 3D solid modeling software, because of behind-the-scenes technical complexities that arise whenever complex surfaces abut or blend into each other; surfaces no longer align or some features do not translate due to the way CAD programs employ different approaches to handling certain object classes. To minimize translation errors, TransMagic typically—but not always—translates directly from one native CAD kernel to another. Still, “stitching errors” (gaps and overlaps) can occur while trying to import the file and reinterpret geometry. TransMagic's “Auto Repair Wizard” corrects these flaws while translating the file.

TransMagic is available as a stand-alone program. It is also available as a plug-in for many CAD programs so that the Open and Save dialog boxes are extended with TransMagic's functionality.

== Supported file types ==
As of September 2010, TransMagic reads and writes to the following file types:

Supported read formats
Format	Extension
CATIA V4	*.model, *.exp, *.dat, *.session, sequential files
CATIA V5	*.CATpart, *.CATproduct, *.cgr
Autodesk Inventor	*.ipt, *.iam
Pro/ENGINEER	*.prt, *.asm
SolidWorks	*.sldasm, *.sldprt
NX (Unigraphics)	*.prt
ACIS	*.sat, *.sab, *.asf, *.asat, *asab
JT	*.jt, *.j_t
Parasolid	*.x_t
IGES	*.igs
STEP	*.stp
HOOPS Meta File	*.hmf
HOOPS Streaming File	*.hsf
PLY	*.ply
Stereo Lithography	*.stl
OBJ	*.obj

Supported write formats
Format	Extension
CATIA V4	*.model
CATIA V5	*.CATpart, *.CATproduct
ACIS	*.sat, *.sab, *.asf, *.asat, *asab
JT	*.jt
Parasolid	*.x_t, *.x_b, *.xmt_txt, *.xmb_txt
IGES	*.igs, *.iges
STEP	*.stp, *.step
HOOPS Meta File	*.hmf
HOOPS Streaming File	*.hsf
NGRAIN	*.3ko
PLY	*.ply
Stereo Lithography	*.stl
HTML	*.htm
OBJ	*.obj

== See also ==
- List of file formats
- List of file formats (alphabetical)
- List of CAD programs
- Comparison of CAD editors for CAE
