= AutoCAD version history =

Computer aided design software

AutoCAD is a commercial computer-aided design (CAD) and drafting software application by Autodesk. The first release of the software started with version 1.0 in December 1982. The software has been continuously updated since its initial release.

AutoCAD opens documents with DWG compatibility as a "DWG file format version code" where the specific version code can be found by opening the .dwg file in Windows Notepad or any text editor program. The file contents starts with this string. The file format version code (tag) is dependent on the AutoCAD version.

== History ==
The following table summarizes the version history of the AutoCAD software application.

Release name	Version	Date of release	DWG tag	Release	OS support	Comments
Version 1.0	1.0	December 1982	MC0.0	1		DWG R1.0 file format
Version 1.2	1.2	April 1983	AC1.2	2		DWG R1.2 file format
Version 1.3	1.3	August 1983		3		DWG R1.3 file format
Version 1.4	1.4	October 1983	AC1.4	4		DWG R1.4 file format
Version 2.0	2.0	October 1984	AC1.50	5		DWG R2.05 file format
Version 2.1	2.1	May 1985	AC2.10	6		DWG R2.1 file format
Version 2.5	2.5	June 1986	AC1002	7		DWG R2.5 file format
Version 2.6	2.6	April 1987	AC1003	8		DWG R2.6 file format. Last version that can be run without a math co-processor.
Release 9	9.0	September 1987	AC1004	9		DWG R9 file format
Release 10	10.0	October 1988	AC1006	10	MS-DOS	DWG R10 file format. Sole release for System 6, Xenix and OS/2 1.x.
Release 11	11.0	October 1990	AC1009	11	MS-DOS 3.3	DWG R11 file format, the first version to incorporate basic 3D solid modeling via the Advanced Modeling Extension (AME). Last release for DOS 286.
Release 11	11.0	March 1992	AC1009	11	Mac OS 7	DWG R11 file format, the first version to incorporate basic 3D solid modeling via the Advanced Modeling Extension (AME). Last release for DOS 286.
Release 12	12.0	June 1992	AC1009	12	MS-DOS 3.3; Mac OS 7	DWG R11/R12 file format. Last release for SunOS 4.1 and Ultrix.
Release 12	12.0	February 1993	AC1009	12	Windows 3.1	DWG R11/R12 file format. Last release for SunOS 4.1 and Ultrix.
Release 13	13.0	November 1994	AC1012	13	MS-DOS 5.0; Windows 3.1; NT 3.1; NT 3.5	DWG R13 file format. Sole release for Windows NT Alpha. Last release for AIX, Solaris, IRIX, HP-UX and DOS.
Release 14	14.0	February 1997	AC1014	14	Windows 95; NT 3.51; NT 4.0	DWG R14 file format
2000	15.0	March 1999	AC1015	15	Windows 95; 98; NT 4.0	DWG 2000 file format. Multi-Document Interface.
2000i	15.1	July 2000	AC1015	16	Windows 95; 98; NT 4.0; 2000	
2002	15.2	June 2001	AC1015	17	Windows 98; ME; NT 4.0; 2000	
2004	16.0	March 2003	AC1018	18	Windows NT 4.0; 2000; XP	DWG 2004 file format
2005	16.1	March 2004	AC1018	19	Windows 2000; XP	
2006	16.2	March 2005	AC1018	20	Windows 2000; XP	Dynamic Block
2007	17.0	March 2006	AC1021	21	Windows 2000; XP	DWG 2007 file format
2008	17.1	March 2007	AC1021	22	Windows 2000; XP; Vista	Annotative objects introduced. AutoCAD 2008 and higher (including AutoCAD LT) can directly import and underlay DGN V8 files.
2009	17.2	March 2008	AC1021	23	Windows XP; Vista	Revisions to the user interface including the introduction of the Ribbon
2010	18.0	March 24, 2009	AC1024	24	Windows XP; Vista; 7	DWG 2010 file format introduced. Parametrics introduced. Mesh 3D solid modeling was introduced. PDF underlays. Both 32-bit and 64-bit versions of AutoCAD 2010 and AutoCAD LT 2010 are compatible with and supported under Microsoft Windows 7.
2011	18.1	March 25, 2010	AC1024	25	Windows XP; Vista; 7	Surface modeling, surface analysis, and object transparency introduced. Intel-only on Mac OS X.
2011	18.1	October 15, 2010	AC1024	25	Mac OS X 10.5; 10.6	Surface modeling, surface analysis, and object transparency introduced. Intel-only on Mac OS X.
2012	18.2	March 22, 2011	AC1024	26	Windows XP; Vista; 7	Associative array, model documentation, DGN editing. Support for complex line types in DGN files is improved in AutoCAD 2012.
2012	18.2	August 19, 2011	AC1024	26	Mac OS X 10.6; 10.7; 10.8	Associative array, model documentation, DGN editing. Support for complex line types in DGN files is improved in AutoCAD 2012.
2013	19.0	March 27, 2012	AC1027	27	Windows XP; Vista; 7; 8	DWG 2013 file format (AC1027)
2014	19.1	March 26, 2013	AC1027	28	Windows XP; Vista; 7; 8	File tabs, design feed, reality capture, live maps
2015	20.0	March 27, 2014	AC1027	29	Windows 7; 8; 8.1	Line smoothing (anti-aliasing)
2016	20.1	March 23, 2015	AC1027	30	Windows 7 SP1; 8.1; 10	More comprehensive canvas, richer design context, and intelligent new tools such as smart dimensioning, coordination model, and enhanced PDFs
2017	21.0	March 21, 2016	AC1027	31	Windows 7 SP1; 8.1; 10	PDF import, associative center marks, and centerlines, DirectX 11 graphics
2018	22.0	March 21, 2017	AC1032	32	Windows 7 SP1; 8.1; 10	DWG 2018 file format and Mac. "Off-screen" selection.
2019	23.0	March 22, 2018	AC1032	33	Windows 7 SP1; 8.1; 10	Specialized toolsets (electrical, architecture, MEP, etc.) with One AutoCAD, Shared Views, DWG Compare, Save To AutoCAD Web & Mobile
2020	23.1	March 27, 2019	AC1032	34	Windows 7 SP1; 8.1; 10	New dark theme, quick measurements, blocks palette, Microsoft OneDrive and Box.com integration, dropped support for 32bit Windows
2021	24.0	March 25, 2020	AC1032	35	Vendor dependent; Windows 8.1; 10	Drawing history, Xref compare, Google Drive integration, offline activation removed, Quick Trim & Extend Mode
2022	24.1	March 23, 2021	AC1032	36	Vendor dependent; Windows 10; 11	Trace, Count, Floating Drawing
2023	24.2	March 28, 2022	AC1032	37	Windows 10; 11	Count, Floating Windows, Trace Markup Import and Markup Assist with text recognition, improved 3D Graphics
2024	24.3	March 27, 2023	AC1032	38	Windows 10; 11	
2025	25.0	March 26, 2024	AC1032	39	Windows 10; 11	ObjectArx .Net plugin model changed from .Net Framework to .Net Core
2026	25.1	March 25, 2025	AC1032	40	Windows 10; 11	
2027	26.0	March 25, 2026	AC1032	41	Windows 11	Geometry Cleanup, Autodesk Assistant, Connected References, Checkout, Connected Support Files
