= PowerCADD =

- Developer: Engineered Software
- Release: September 1987
- Stable release: 9 (7 for PowerPC) / August 2010
- Operating system: Mac OS X
- Platform: Intel (Version 7 supports PowerPC )
- Type: Computer-aided design
- License: (Proprietary commercial software)
- Website: www.engsw.com/products

PowerCADD is a computer-aided design and drafting (CADD) software program for the Apple Macintosh platform developed from out of the PowerDraw platform of the mid-1980s by Greensboro, North Carolina–based Engineered Software.

== History ==
The development of PowerCADD began with PowerDraw, a true CADD alternative to MacDraw that was released in the mid-1980s. The online user group from GEnie that participated in outlining the capabilities of the new CADD program were invited to initiate a graphics forum on Applelink Personal Edition in 1987.

== Description ==
PowerCADD is a two-dimensional, WYSIWYG drawing program developed mainly to reproduce the familiarity of manual technical drawing with the advantages of a full geometry tool set (including bezier) and computer graphics, allowing the full mix of line art and raster images. PowerCADD is a full metaphor for the design board, providing an elegant easy to learn and easy to use interface, with the integration of both Imperial and Metric dimensioning in familiar "real world" scales. An add-on tool set, called WildTools, was developed by an independent programmer, bringing a number of new capabilities to the program, including isometric and perspective-drawing tools. Both are available in "demo" form to allow hands-on trial use.

The current shipping version is PowerCADD 9, which was released August 2010. PowerCADD 9 is an Apple Intel Only application.

== Versions ==
- PowerDraw 1 for the 680x0 Mac, released September 1987
- PowerDraw 2 for the 680x0 Mac
- PowerDraw 3 for the 680x0 Mac
- PowerDraw 4 for the 680x0 Mac
- PowerDraw 5 for the 680x0 Mac
- PowerDraw 6 for the 680x0 Mac and PowerCADD 1 for the PPC Mac OS 7 (then known as Macintosh System 7)
- PowerCADD 2 released October 1995
- PowerCADD 3 released in late 1996
- PowerCADD 4
- PowerCADD 2000 (PowerCADD 5), released May 2000. Major enhancements to text handling and symbol data.
- PowerCADD 6, released May 2003, the first Mac OS X native version with Aqua interface.
- PowerCADD 7, released January 2006. Featuring transparent objects and layers, improved DWG/DXF translation, and global management of drawing attributes. PowerPC hardware and related Mac OS X Software required.
- PowerCADD 8 for Intel-based Apple hardware released March 2008 PDF Brochure Link
- PowerCADD 9 for Intel-based Apple hardware released August 2010 PDF Brochure Link

== See also ==
- Comparison of CAD editors for CAE
