= SmartGeometry Group =

SmartGeometry (SG) is a non-profit organization focusing on the use of the computer as an intelligent design aid in architecture, engineering and construction (AEC). It encourages collaboration between practicing AEC professionals, academics and students using computational and parametric software tools.

== Group information and activities ==
The group is led by Lars Hesselgren of KPF, Hugh Whitehead of Foster + Partners and J. Parrish of Arup Sport.

SG hosts annual workshops and conferences on the use of advanced modelling tools and new design methodologies in architecture. Participants come from architectural and engineering practices.

Smartgeometry hosted its 2014 edition 'sg2014 Hong Kong' at the Chinese University of Hong Kong, China, from 14-19 July - chaired by Marc Aurel Schnabel. The Workshop and Conference was titled and themed: "Urban Compaction" to explore proposals for high and increasing density in cities with innovative approaches to modelling in diverse areas of the city's dynamics. The event was held in two parts, a four-day Workshop 14-17 July, and a public conference beginning with Talkshop 18 July, followed by a Symposium 19 July; followed the format of the preceding events 'sg2010 Barcelona', 'sg2011 Copenhagen', 'sg2012 Troy', and 'sg2013 London'.

GenerativeComponents is a commercial software product by Bentley Systems, brought to the market after a testing cycle by a user community with SG members in its core.

== See also ==
- Architecture
- Architectural engineering
- Design computing
- Comparison of CAD Software
- GenerativeComponents
