= VariCAD =

- Developer: VariCAD
- Stable release: 2026 2.05 / February 2026; 4 months ago
- Operating system: Linux, Windows
- Type: CAD/CAM software
- License: Proprietary software
- Website: VariCAD Homepage

VariCAD is a computer program for 3D/2D CAD and mechanical engineering which has been developed since 1988 in the Czech Republic. VariCAD runs on Windows and Linux. It features many tools for 3D modeling and 2D drafting. VariCAD provides support for parameters and geometric constraints, tools for shells, pipelines, sheet metal unbending and crash tests, assembly support, mechanical part and symbol libraries, calculations, bills of materials, and more.

The program includes a standard part library with screws, nuts, bearings etc. Additionally, it offers many calculation modules for, e.g., springs, beam torsion, volume, mass and center of gravity.

VariCAD allows editing of DWG files without conversion using the Open Design Alliance DWGdirect libraries. VariCAD also supports the ISO industrial product data exchange format STEP/STP. A list of notable supported file formats is listed in the Comparison of CAD software article.

VariCAD is available for both Windows and for some time on the Linux OS. With the addition of support for Unicode user interface now also supports non Latin character sets such as those used in the Japanese, Chinese and Russian languages.

VariCAD is available in English, German, Portuguese and Japanese languages.

VariCAD Viewer is a proprietary computer program for viewing of 3D/2D CAD files. It runs on the Windows and Linux operating systems. Notable supported file formats are listed in the Comparison of CAD, CAM and CAE file viewers article.

== See also ==
- Comparison of CAD, CAM and CAE file viewers
- Comparison of CAD editors for AEC
