= OrthoGraph =

OrthoGraph Ltd
- Developer: OrthoGraph
- Stable release: 10.0 / April 2015
- Operating system: IOS, iPad
- Type: CAD, Software, Surveying
- Website: OrthoGraph website

OrthoGraph I is a building survey and floorplan creation application for iOS and Android mobile operating systems, developed by OrthoGraph, a software developer based in Budapest, Hungary. The software can be used to support building information modeling processes.

== Product history ==
The first version of OrthoGraph was released in 2004 for PDA devices. An iPad version of the application was released in 2011.

In 2013, a cooperation agreement was established between OrthoGraph and Leica, so that several Leica laser distance meters were supported by OrthoGraph's application. Bluetooth support for the Bosch GLM 100 C laser distance meter also became available. OrthoGraph also developed its own cloud computing services.

In 2015 OrthoGraph began developing its Android version. In September 2016, a multi-platform version of the app was published, called OrthoGraph I, with a new user interface, more accurate measurement, and faster workflows.

== Software overview ==
OrthoGraph I can capture data from third-party distance measuring devices (from Leica, Bosch and Stabila). Data is transferred via Bluetooth, with floorplan outputs shareable with users on other devices.

Supported formats include DXF (AutoCAD), PDF (Adobe), IFC (Industrial Foundation Classes), JPEG, and PNG. Data can also be exported to ArchiCAD using a separate module.

=== Version history ===
- 2011 – OrthoGraph Architect 3D for iPad - first iPad version
- 2013 – launch of OrthoGraph Cloud
- 2014 – OrthoGraph 9.0
- 2015 – OrthoGraph Architect 3D 10.0
- 2016 – OrthoGraph I multi-Platform release
