= Caddie (CAD system) =

Commercial computer-aided design (CAD) and drafting software application

- Developer(s): Advanced Computer Solutions Limited
- Initial release: 1986
- Stable release: 27 / September 2021
- Operating system: Windows
- Type: CAD
- License: Proprietary
- Website: www.caddiesoftware.com

Caddie is a mid-range computer-assisted draughting (CAD) software package for 2D and 3D design. It is used primarily by architects, but has tools for surveyors and mechanical, civil, construction engineers and GIS Professionals. It was initially designed as an electronic drawing board, using concepts and tools clearly related to a physical board.

Caddie requires a USB dongle or Software Licence. or software activation. Without the dongle or activation, the program can be used as a viewer and plot station for any DWG drawings, but it can't save drawings after the 14-day evaluation has expired. Caddie works on Windows 7, Windows 8, Windows 10 and Windows 11.

== Version history ==
Caddie was created by Anthony Spruyt, an architect from Pretoria, South Africa, in 1985 and was originally called Michael Angelo. The first release version was called Caddie and fit on a single 360 kB floppy disk, and was designed for the IBM Personal Computer XT. Caddie was one of the first CAD tools that utilised microcomputers and did not require a mainframe computer with workstation access. Version 1 of Caddie was released in 1986, for MS-DOS. The first version for Microsoft Windows (16-bit) was released in September 1993. The 32-bit Windows version was released in May 1997.

Version 6 was available by 2000. In the same year, a lite version of Caddie was available, called Caddie Budget, with the non-lite version being called Caddie Professional. Version 7 was available in 2001. Caddy Budget Architectural 7 retailed in the UK for £595 in 2003. Version 9 was released in January 2003. Caddie initially used its own proprietary file format .DRW (binary) and an ASCII .CEX (Caddie Exchange format). Caddie could also import and export native AutoCad .DWG and .DXF file formats, but since version 10, Caddie rewrote its core kernels and now uses as native file format OpenDWG. Version 10 was released in March 2005. Version 11 was released in January 2007 and was the first version compatible with Windows Vista. Caddie 12 was released in September 2008.

The latest version of Caddie is version 31, released on 16 September 2025. There are four versions of the product, namely Caddie Professional (the full version), Caddie Budget (the lite version), Caddie Vio (for photo-realistic rendering, based on Lightworks,) and Caddie Educational, which is licensed to students even though it has all the functionality of Caddie Professional.

== Functionality ==
Caddie Professional and Caddie Educational contain the following applications:

Caddie - the main drawing application with tools for creation and editing of common entities such as lines, arcs, construction lines, splines, ellipses, images, blocks, ole objects etc.

AEC - the smart tools for creation and editing of 2D and 3D Architectural, Engineering And Construction intelligent objects such as walls, windows, doors, openings, slabs, roofs, trusses etc. These intelligent objects have different representations depending on the view.

DTM - the digital terrain modelling tools for creation of TIN models from points or contours. The application includes tools for creation and manipulation of live long and cross sections as well as cut and fill volumes for site development.

Arch applications - country specific applications with additional tools for the creation and editing of Architectural objects, relating to specific regions. For example, the SA Arch module contains tools for doing live SANS 204 Energy efficiency calculations now required when submitting building plans in South Africa.

3D - tools for the creation and manipulation of general purpose 3D primitives. In addition this module has many of the tools required for controlling different 3D views and user coordinate systems.

Mech - automated tools for the creation of commonly drawn mechanical objects such as nuts and bolts, machining and geometrical tolerancing symbols, steel beams and angles, gears, sheet metal developments and welding symbols. The 3D application is where the tools for the optional Vio photo realistic rendering add-on will be found as well as export tools to PovRay.

Survey - an array of tools developed specifically for working with complex construction surveys, unusually equally applicable to southern and northern hemispheres. It includes functionality for spot heights, polar coordinates, coordinate joins, transition curves, height interpolation, helmert transformations, as well as full GPS integration using multiple different coordinate systems.

Civil - tools for the creation of common symbols used on GA drawings, long sections, turning circles pipe layouts etc. as well as tools for sewer, stormwater and electrical layouts.

GIS - The GIS module has tools for connecting to many different GIS datasources and combining the information obtained from them with design data in many different projections. Information created in Caddie can also be uploaded to GIS datasources. Formats that can be used include but are not limited to ArcGIS, MySQL, SQL Server, PostGres, Shape File, KML, KMZ, Georeferenced TIFF, Google Maps, Bing Mapping.

Steel - tools for standard BS steel sections, bracing, angles and beams. Automatic creation of handrails, catladders, steel stairs, fences and steel trusses including input of data from Prokon.

== Company history ==
Caddie was originally developed in South Africa in 1985, and it quickly established a significant presence in its home market. The product's position in South Africa began to erode in the 1990s following the lifting of economic sanctions against South Africa, as other CAD packages entered that market. A Microsoft Windows version of Caddie was not released until 1993.

In 1998, Caddie was acquired by the South African software development company Billcad Holdings. By this time, Caddie had about 11 000 users. In 1999, Billcad became Planit Technology. In early 2001, Planit Technologies went into liquidation.

By March 2002, the British company Advanced Computer Solutions (ACS) bought all the rights from the South African holders and also acquired the Caddie operation within South Africa. ACS was previously Caddie's British distributor. ACS has offices in South Africa and the United Kingdom.

== See also ==
- Comparison of CAD editors for CAE
- AutoCAD
- IntelliCAD
