= Intergraph Standard File Formats =

Intergraph Standard File Formats (ISFF) are the file formats common to MicroStation and Intergraph's Interactive Graphics Design System (IGDS). ISFF is made available to the public, so that third-party developers could create applications for MicroStation that read and write ISFF format without a license from Intergraph.

- Design files, or DGN files (*.dgn) are binary files with variable-length records for graphic elements, and non-graphic data.
- Cell library files (*.cel) are binary files that store cell definitions for placement in design files.

MicroStation versions 8 and newer support the V8 DGN file format, but which has a different internal data structure than the ISFF-based DGN. In cases where there is potential for confusion, ISFF-based DGN may be called Intergraph DGN, or V7 DGN.

Autodesk has chosen not to support DGN in AutoCAD 2006, although it does support the format in its Map3D, Land Desktop, and Civil3D products.
