= Computer Graphics Metafile =

Image file format family

- Filename extension: .cgm
- Internet media type: image/cgm
- Developed by: ANSI, ISO/IEC, W3C
- Initial release: 1986; 39 years ago (ANSI X3 122-1986)
- Type of format: Vector image format
- Extended from: Graphical Kernel System
- Standard: ISO/IEC 8632
- Website: ISO/IEC 8632

Computer Graphics Metafile (CGM) is a free and open international standard file format for 2D vector graphics, raster graphics, and text, and is defined by ISO/IEC 8632.

== Overview ==
All graphical elements can be specified in a textual source file that can be compiled into a binary file or one of two text representations. CGM provides a means of graphics data interchange for computer representation of 2D graphical information independent from any particular application, system, platform, or device.

As a metafile, i.e., a file containing information that describes or specifies another file, the CGM format has numerous elements to provide functions and to represent entities, so that a wide range of graphical information and geometric primitives can be accommodated. Rather than establish an explicit graphics file format, CGM contains the instructions and data for reconstructing graphical components to render an image using an object-oriented approach.

Although CGM is not widely supported for web pages and has been supplanted by other formats in the graphic arts, it is still prevalent in engineering, aviation, and other technical applications.

The initial CGM implementation was effectively a streamed representation of a sequence of Graphical Kernel System (GKS) primitive operations. It has been adopted to some extent in the areas of technical illustration and professional design, but has largely been superseded by formats such as SVG and DXF.

The World Wide Web Consortium has developed WebCGM, a profile of CGM intended for the use of CGM on the Web.

== History ==
- 1986 – ANSI X3 122-1986 (ANSI X3 committee)
- 1987 – ISO 8632-1987 (ISO)
- 1991 – ANSI/ISO 8632-1987 (ANSI and ISO)
- 1992 – ISO 8632:1992, a.k.a. CGM:1992 (ISO)
- 1999 – ISO/IEC 8632:1999, 2nd Edition (ISO/IEC JTC1/SC24)
- December 17, 2001 – WebCGM (W3C)
- January 30, 2007 – WebCGM 2.0 (W3C)
- March 1, 2010 – WebCGM 2.1 (W3C Recommendation)

== See also ==
- Comparison of graphics file formats
