= Jack (human modeling) =

The Jack human simulation system was developed at the Center for Human Modeling and Simulation at the University of Pennsylvania in the 1980s & 1990s under the direction of Professor Norman Badler. Conceived as an ergonomic assessment and virtual human prototyping system for NASA space shuttle development, it soon gathered funding from the U.S. Navy and U.S. Army for dismounted soldier simulation, from the U.S. Air Force for maintenance simulation, and from various other government and corporate users for their own applications. In 1996 the software was spun off into a privately held company and is now sold as an ergonomic human simulation toolkit (called Tecnomatix Jack) by Siemens. The research and development of the Jack system have led to such standards as H-anim and MPEG4 Body Animation Parameters.

The roots of most modern human animation Inverse kinematics systems can be traced to the research and development done for the Jack system. Some of these animation systems include those integrated with Autodesk's 3ds max, Maya, and proprietary in-house systems used by various animation studios, such as Industrial Light and Magic.

== Corporate history ==
The original Jack software company was called Transom. It was sold to Engineering Animation, Inc. (EAI) which later was acquired by Unigraphics Solutions (UGS). Unigraphics was then re-incorporated into Electronic Data Systems (EDS) and then spun off again as a privately held company called UGS. After the acquisition of Tecnomatix, Jack became officially part of the Tecnomatix product line. UGS was eventually acquired by Siemens.
