= PICT =

Graphics file format

- Filename extension: .pict, .pct, .pic
- Internet media type: image/x-pict
- Type code: PICT
- Uniform Type Identifier (UTI): com.apple.pict
- Developed by: Apple Computer
- Type of format: graphics

PICT is a graphics file format introduced on the original Apple Macintosh computer as its standard metafile format. It allows the interchange of graphics (both bitmapped and vector), and some limited text support, between Mac applications, and was the native graphics format of QuickDraw.

The PICT file format consists essentially of a series of QuickDraw commands. The original version, PICT 1, was designed to be as compact as possible while describing vector graphics. To this end, it featured single byte opcodes, many of which embodied operations such as "do the previous operation again". As such it was quite memory efficient, but not very expandable. With the introduction of the Macintosh II and Color QuickDraw, PICT was revised to version 2. This version featured 16-bit opcodes and numerous changes which enhanced its utility. PICT 1 opcodes were supported as a subset for backward compatibility.

Within a Mac application, any sequence of drawing operations could be simply recorded/encoded to the PICT format by opening a "Picture", then closing it after issuing the required commands. By saving the resulting byte stream as a resource, a PICT resource resulted, which could be loaded and played back at any time. The same stream could be saved to a data file on disk (with 512 bytes of unused header space added) as a PICT file.

With the change to Mac OS X and discontinuation of QuickDraw, PICT was dropped in favor of Portable Document Format (PDF) as the native metafile format, though PICT support is retained by many applications as it was so widely supported on Classic Mac OS.

This "PICT" image format supports single channel and color channel RGB images and grayscale images. Photoshop no longer has the ability to open PICT files which use QuickDraw object data (but can open simple raster-based PICTs), and cannot save files in PICT format.

== PICT versions ==
The PICT format has two versions:

- PICT 1 format: The old format that only allowed eight colors and focused on compact storage.
- PICT 2 format: A superset of format 1 that supports 4, 8, 16 and 24-bit color and greyscale images. 32-bit color with a generally unused alpha channel is also supported. Furthermore certain compressed PixMap types can be included using QuickTime.

== Compression method ==
With the QuickTime 2.0 multimedia framework, Apple added support for compression using JPEG or any other QuickTime compressor to bitmaps embedded in PICT data.

== See also ==
- QuickDraw
- MacPaint
- Mac OS X
- Portable Document Format
- Graphics file format
