= OFF (file format) =

Geometry definition file format

OFF geometry format
- Filename extension: .off
- Internet media type: text/plain
- Type of format: 3D model format

OFF (Object File Format) is a geometry definition file format containing the description of the composing polygons of a geometric object. It can store 2D or 3D objects, and simple extensions allow it to represent higher-dimensional objects as well. Though originally developed for Geomview, a geometry visualization software, other software has adapted the simple standard.

== Composition ==
The composition of a standard OFF file is as follows:

- First line (optional): the letters OFF to mark the file type.
- Second line: the number of vertices, number of faces, and number of edges, in order (the latter can be ignored by writing 0 instead).
- List of vertices: X, Y and Z coordinates.
- List of faces: number of vertices, followed by the indexes of the composing vertices, in order (indexed from zero).
  - Optionally, the RGB values for the face color can follow the elements of the faces.

The four-dimensional OFF format, most notably used by Stella4D, which allows visualization of four-dimensional objects, has a few minor differences:

- First line (optional): the letters 4OFF to mark the file type.
- Second line: the number of vertices, number of faces, number of edges, and number of cells, in order (the number of edges can be ignored).
- List of vertices: X, Y, Z and W coordinates.
- List of faces: number of vertices, followed by the indexes of the composing vertices, in order (indexed from zero).
- List of cells: number of faces, followed by the indexes of the composing faces, in order (indexed from zero).
  - Optionally, the RGB values for the cell color can follow the elements of the cells.

The vertex, face, and cell data can only be distinguished by the amounts defined at the top of the file. For example, the line "4 0 1 2 3" cannot be distinguished between a tetrahedral cell with faces (0, 1, 2, 3), and a face with vertices (0, 1, 2, 3), if it weren't for the header at the top. Similarly, "3 0 1 2" could be a face with vertices (0, 1, 2) or a 4D vertex with points (3.0, 0.0, 1.0, 2.0).

Comments are marked with a pound sign (#): these are not required to be read by the software.

== Example ==
OFF
# cube.off
# A cube
8 6 12
 1.0  0.0 1.4142
 0.0  1.0 1.4142
-1.0  0.0 1.4142
 0.0 -1.0 1.4142
 1.0  0.0 0.0
 0.0  1.0 0.0
-1.0  0.0 0.0
 0.0 -1.0 0.0
4  0 1 2 3  255 0 0 #red
4  7 4 0 3  0 255 0 #green
4  4 5 1 0  0 0 255 #blue
4  5 6 2 1  0 255 0 
4  3 2 6 7  0 0 255
4  6 5 4 7  255 0 0

== See also ==
- Wavefront .obj file
- STL (file format)
- PLY (file format) is an alternative file format offering more flexibility than most stereolithography applications.
