= MicroStation =

Software for computer aided design

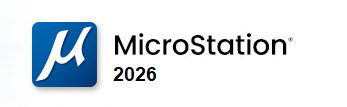
- Developer: Bentley Systems
- Release: 1980s
- Stable release: 26.00.02.39 / August 20, 2026; 57 days ago
- Operating system: Windows 11
- Platform: .NET Framework
- Type: CAD
- License: Proprietary software
- Website: bentley.com/.../microstation

MicroStation is a CAD software platform for two- and three-dimensional design and drafting, developed and sold by Bentley Systems and used in the architectural and engineering industries. It generates 2D/3D vector graphics objects and elements and includes building information modeling (BIM) features. The current version is MicroStation CONNECT Edition.

== History ==
MicroStation was initially developed by 3 Individual developers and sold and supported by Intergraph in the 1980s. The latest versions of the software are released solely for Microsoft Windows operating systems, but historically MicroStation was available for Macintosh platforms and a number of Unix-like operating systems. From its inception MicroStation was designed as an IGDS (Interactive Graphics Design System) file editor for the PC. Its initial development was a result of the developers experience developing PseudoStation released in 1984, a program designed to replace the use of proprietary Intergraph graphic workstations to edit DGN files by substituting the much less expensive Tektronix compatible graphics terminals. PseudoStation as well as Intergraph's IGDS program ran on a modified version of Digital Equipment Corporation's VAX super-mini computer.

In 1985, MicroStation 1.0 was released as a DGN file read-only and plot program designed to run exclusively on the IBM PC-AT personal computer.

In 1987, MicroStation 2.0 was released, and was the first version of MicroStation to read and write DGN files.

Almost two years later, MicroStation 3.0 was released, which took advantage of the increasing processing power of the PC, particularly with respect to dynamics.

Intergraph MicroStation 4.0 was released in late 1990 and added many features: reference file clipping and masking, a DWG translator, fence modes, the ability to name levels, as well as GUI enhancements. The 1992 release of version 4 introduced the ability to write applications using the MicroStation Development Language (MDL).

In 1993, MicroStation 5.0 was released. New capabilities included binary raster support, custom line styles, settings manager, and dimension driven design. The "V5 for Power Macintosh provided a comprehensive tool set for both 2-D and 3-D CAD ... with added several truly useful features ... the high-end PowerPC- native CAD package runs on steroids." This was the last version to be supported in Unix. This version was branded both Intergraph (on CLIX) and Bentley MicroStation (on PC). Later versions were all branded Bentley. This was the last version to run on Intergraph CLIX. All platforms other than the PC used 32-bit processors.

In 1995, Windows 95 was released. Bentley soon followed with a release of MicroStation for that operating system. Aside from being the first version of MicroStation to not include the version number in its name (MicroStation 95 was actually MicroStation v5.5), MicroStation 95 included the ability to be mostly driven by graphic icon buttons. This version introduced a host of new features: Accudraw, dockable dialogs, Smartline, revised view controls, movie generation, and the ability to use two application windows (similar to previous Unix driven Intergraph terminals. Many of these features are among the most popular used today. MicroStation 95 was the first version of MicroStation for a PC platform to use 32-bit hardware.

The last multi-platform release, MicroStation SE (SE standing for special edition, but it was actually MicroStation 5.7) was released late in 1997, and was the first MicroStation release to include color button icons. These icons could also be made borderless, just like in Office 97. This version of MicroStation also included several features to enable more work over the internet. This version also introduced enhanced precision and a very commonly used tool in MicroStation - PowerSelector.

MicroStation/J (a.k.a. MicroStation 7.0, a.k.a. MicroStation V7) was released almost a year after SE. The J in the software title stood for Java, as this version introduced a Java-enhanced version of MDL, called JMDL. Other features included QuickvisionGL and a revised help system. MicroStation/J was the last version to be based upon the IGDS file format; since MicroStation/J was actually Version 7, the file format became known as "V7 DGN". That file format had been used for about 20 years.

However, with the advent of MicroStation V8 in 2001 came a new IEEE-754 based 64-bit file format, referred to as V8 DGN. Along with the new file format came many new enhancements, including unlimited levels, a nearly limitless design plane and no limits on file size. Other features that were added were: Accusnap, Design History, models, unlimited undo, VBA programming, .Net interoperability, True Scale, and standard definitions for working units (as the new file format stored everything internally in meters, but can recognize rational unit conversions so that it can know the size of geometry)(some of these features were also available in MicroStation 95 to MicroStation/J). It also included the ability to work natively with DWG files.

MicroStation V8 2004 Edition (V8.5) followed nearly three years later with support for newer DWG releases, Multi-snaps, PDF creation, the Standards Checker and Feature modeling. MicroStation V8 XM Edition (V8.9) was released in May 2006. It builds upon the changes made by V8. The XM edition includes a completely revised Direct3d-based graphics subsystem, PDF References, task navigation, element templates, color books, support for PANTONE and RAL color systems and keyboard mapping.

In MicroStation V8i (V8.11) (November 2008) the task navigation was overhauled and the then newest DWG format was supported. MicroStation now contains a module for GPS data.

MicroStation CONNECT Edition (V10.XX) first release in September 2015. This version updated the application architecture to 64-bit and changed to a Ribbon Interface. Future versions are being delivered as (roughly) quarterly updates.

MicroStation 2023 (23.00.00.108) was released on June 28th, 2023. This is the first major release adopting the new naming convention. New features include improved workflows, and several user experience enhancements, with focuses on a new access to geospatial features and maps, issue resolution improvements, increased data reporting.

== File format support ==
Its native format is the DGN format, though it can also read and write a variety of standard CAD formats including DWG, DXF, SKP and OBJ and produce media output in such forms as rendered images (JPEG and BMP), animations (AVI), 3D web pages in Virtual Reality Modeling Language (VRML), and Adobe Systems PDF.

At its inception, MicroStation was used in the engineering and architecture fields primarily for creating construction drawings; however, it has evolved through its various versions to include advanced parametric modeling and rendering features, including Boolean solids, VUE Rendering, raytracing, pathtracing, PBR Materials, and keyframe animation. It can provide specialized environments for architecture, civil engineering, mapping, or plant design, among others.

In 2000, Bentley made revisions to the DGN file format in V8 to add additional features like Digital Rights and Design History - a revision control ability that allows reinstating previous revisions either globally or by selection, and to better support import/export of Autodesk's DWG format. Additionally, the V8 DGN file format removed many data restrictions from earlier releases such as limited design levels and drawing area. CONNECT Edition versions continue to use the V8 DGN file format.

== See also ==
- ProjectWise
- GenerativeComponents
- Comparison of computer-aided design editors
- Rendering (computer graphics)
