= Intermediate Data Format =

- Developed by: David Kehmeier

Intermediate Data Format (IDF) files are used interoperate between electronic design automation (EDA) software and solid modeling mechanical computer-aided design (CAD) software.

The format was devised by David Kehmeier at the Mentor Graphics Corporation.

The EMN File contains the PCB outline, the position of the parts, positions of holes and milling, keep out regions and keep in regions.

The EMP file contains the outline and height of the parts.

Some CAD software allows the use of a map file to load more detailed part models.

== Compared to STEP ==
STEP - also known as ISO 10303-21 - has both advantages and disadvantages over IDF.

If both MCAD and ECAD software support STEP, both programs can interchange more detailed models (at the cost of increased file size). Step models that are rendered correctly in the ECAD software can cause problems in the MCAD.

IDF does allow the communication of keep out areas and part placements more directly. IDF is a very simple and robust format. If necessary, the files can be edited by hand in a text editor.
