= Elematic =

Elematic Oy Ab
- Type: Public limited company
- Industry: Metal industry
- Founded: 1959; 67 years ago
- Headquarters: Akaa, Finland
- Key people: Teppo Voutilainen (CEO)
- Products: Machines and technology for precast concrete industry
- Revenue: €75,100,000 (2014)
- Number of employees: 241 (2014)
- Website: www.elematic.com

Elematic Ltd is a Finnish company founded in 1959, which supplies precast concrete machinery and equipment, production lines and complete production plants worldwide. Elematic is in more than 100 countries, across five continents.

== History ==
=== 1960s ===
Toijalan Teräsvalmiste (TTV) began building machinery for the precast concrete industry in 1959. In 1969, TTV founded a German sister company Finn Elematic Baugeräte GmbH in Nidda, outside of Frankfurt.

=== 1970s ===
The first ELEMATIC extruder was built in the early 1970s and sold to Partek (acquired by Kone in 2001), a Finnish cement and building materials manufacturer. In 1973 Partek acquired TTV, forming Partek Heavy Metal Industry with 400 employees. Finn-Elematic GmbH marketed ELEMATIC products in Germany and in other German-speaking countries.

=== 1980s ===
In 1981 manufacturing and engineering were separated into own business units: Toijala Workshop for building machines and Elematic Engineering (EE) for engineering, marketing and selling. The separation became more formal as two limited liability companies Elematic Engineering Oy (1988) and Toijala Works Oy (1990) were formed. In 1984 Dy-Core Systems Inc (DC), a Canadian hollow-core machine manufacturer, was acquired by Elematic Engineering Oy.

=== 1990s ===
In 1992 Partek and Lohja Parma Engineering (which had a subsidiary Induco GmbH, in Germany) began jointly restructuring their building material businesses. Both their precast manufacturing plants and technology units united to form Partek Concrete Engineering. In 1996 Partek Concrete Engineering acquired the business operations of Germany's Roth Machinenbau GmbH and combined it with existing operations in Nidda to form PCE Roth GmbH. The name of the parent company was officially changed to PCE Engineering Oy Ab (PCE).

More acquisitions were made during this period of strong growth:

- 1997 Finnish Mecakone Oy became part of PCE.
- 1998 saw the establishment of a US subsidiary, PCE Elematic, Inc.
- 1999 Finnish Rimera Oy, the manufacturer of molds and beds, was added to PCE.

=== 2000s ===
In 2000 a customer service center was established for after-sale support.

PCE acquired ACOTEC Ltd in November 2001.

In 2003 PCE reverted to the old company name "Elematic", now as Elematic Oy Ab. In 2006, Elematic was acquired by several Finnish investors. Later that year Elematic Group acquired X-Tec Oy, a Finnish hollow-core slab machinery manufacturer.

In 2007 a Finnish investor group, led by private equity investor Sentica Partners, sold Elematic Group to a private equity fund managed by Pamplona Capital Management. The management of Elematic maintained their shareholdings.

=== 2010s ===
In 2010s Elematic has expanded its business in Asia, Russia and Middle-East.

In 2014 Elematic opened new production facilities in Finland and in India.

In 2015 Elematic became a public limited liability company, Elematic Oyj (plc). The change is related to the issuance of a four-year secured bond in 2014.

== Company ==
As a global company Elematic has subsidiaries Elematic Inc. in the U.S. and Elematic GmbH in Germany, OOO Elematic in Russia, as well as the Elematic sales office and customer service center in Dubai, sales offices in China and Hong Kong. Warehouses for the spare and wear parts locate in Finland, Dubai/the UAE and the USA.

The main marketing areas of Elematic consist of the Middle East, the CIS, the Baltic Countries, and Western Europe. To the United Arab Emirates, Qatar, and Bahrain alone, Elematic has delivered twenty complete factories. Customer Service Center in Dubai is running machinery inspections, factory audits and training in the factories.

== Sources ==
- http://www.elematic.com
- http://www.precastfountain.com
