= Piranesi (software) =

Interactive paint system for 3D scenes

- Developer: Informatix Software International
- Release: 1997; 29 years ago
- Stable release: 5 / April 2007; 19 years ago
- Operating system: Windows, macOS
- Type: Graphics software
- License: Proprietary
- Website: www.piranesi.co.uk

Piranesi is an interactive paint system that enables the user to create artistic images from 3D scenes created using conventional modeling applications.

== Image format ==
Piranesi uses the proprietary EPix file format. For every pixel, additional information is stored, such as distance from the viewer and material settings. EPix files can be rendered from 3D scenes using a fixed viewpoint by Piranesi's companion software, Vedute.

== See also ==
- Matte painting
