= HP-GL =

Page description language created by Hewlett-Packard (HP)

Hewlett-Packard Graphics Language
- Internet media type: application/vnd.hp-HPGL

HP-GL, short for Hewlett-Packard Graphics Language and often written as HPGL, is a page description language created by Hewlett-Packard (HP). HP-GL was the primary page description language used by HP plotters. It was introduced with the plotter HP-9872 in 1977 and became a standard for almost all plotters. Hewlett-Packard's printers also usually support HP-GL/2 in addition to PCL.

== Design ==
The language is formed from a series of two letter codes (mnemonics), followed by optional parameters. For instance an arc can be drawn on a page by sending the string:

AA100,100,50;

This means Arc Absolute, and the parameters place the center of the arc at absolute coordinates 100,100 on the page, with a starting angle of 50 degrees measured counter-clockwise. A fourth optional parameter (not used here) specifies how far the arc continues, and defaults to 5 degrees.

When first introduced, HP-GL contained the following commands:

Command	Meaning
Vector Group
PA x,y{,x,y{...}}	Plot absolute [i]
PR x,y{,x,y{....}}	Plot relative [i]
PD	Pen down
PU	Pen up
Character Group
CA n	Designate alternate character set n [i]
CP spaces, lines	Character plot [d]
CS m	Designate standard set m [i]
DI run, rise	Absolute direction [d]
DR run, rise	Relative direction [d]
LB c, ..., c	Label ASCII string [c]
SA	Select alternate character set
SI wide, high	Absolute character size [d]
SL tan θ	Absolute character slant (from vertical) [d]
SR wide, high	Relative character size [d]
SS	Select standard character set
UC x, y, pen{, ...}	User defined character [i]
Line Type Group
LT t{,l}	Designate line type t and length l [d]
SM c	Symbol mode [c]
SP n	Select pen [i]
VA	Adaptive velocity
VN	Normal velocity
VS v{,n}	Select velocity v for pen n [i]
Digitize Group
DC	Digitize clear
DP	Digitize point
OC	Output current position and pen status
OD	Output digitized point and pen status
Axes
TL tp{,tn}	Tick length [d]
XT	X axis tick
YT	Y axis tick
Set-Up Group
IP p1x,p1y,p2x,p2y	Input p1 and p2 [i]
IW xlo,ylo,xhi,yhi	Input window [i]
OP	Output p1 and p2 [i]
Configuration Status
AP	Automatic pen pickup [i]
DF	Set default values
IM e{,s{,p}}	Input e, s and p masks [i]
IN	Initialize
OE	Output error [i]
OS	Output status [i]

Commands added (when?)
SI w,h	set character width and height

Formats:

- [i]: integer formats between -32767 and 32768. No decimal point.
- [d]: decimal format between +/- 127.9999. Optional decimal point.
- [c]: ASCII character

== Examples ==
Typical HP-GL files start with a few setup commands, followed by a long string of graphics commands. The file was in ASCII (text file) format, for instance:

An example HP-GL file
Command	Meaning
IN;	initialize, start a plotting job
IP;	set the scaling points (P1 and P2) to their default positions
SP1;	select pen 1
PU0,0;	lift Pen Up and move to starting point for next action
PD100,0,100,100,0,100,0,0;	put Pen Down and move to the following locations (draw a box around the page)
PU50,50;	Pen Up and move to X,Y coordinates 50,50
CI25;	draw a circle with radius 25
SS;	select the standard character set
DT*,1;	set the text delimiter to the asterisk, and do not print them (the 1, meaning "true")
PU20,80;	lift the pen and move to 20,80
LBHello World*;	draw a label

The coordinate system was based on the smallest units one of the HP plotters could support, and was set to 25 μm (i.e. 40 units per millimeter, 1016 per inch). The coordinate space was positive or negative floating point numbers, specifically ±2^{30}.

== HP-GL/2 ==
The original HP-GL language did not support definition of line width, as this parameter was determined by the pens loaded into the plotter. With the advent of the first inkjet plotters, line width for the "pens" specified within the HP-GL files had to be set at the printer so it would know what line width to print for each pen, a cumbersome and error-prone process. With Hewlett-Packard Graphics Language/2 a.k.a. HP-GL/2, definition of line width was introduced into the language and allowed for elimination of this step. Also, among other improvements a binary file format was defined that allowed for smaller files and shorter file transfer times, and the minimal resolution was reduced.

Examples of HP-GL/2 commands
Command	Meaning
NPx	number of pens; x=1..256
PCx,r,g,b	pen color; x=pen, r=red, g=green, b=blue, 0..255
PWw,x	pen width; w=pen width in mm with decimal point, x=pen

== AGL ==
HP-GL is related to AGL (A Graphics Language), an extension of the BASIC programming language. AGL was implemented on Hewlett-Packard minicomputers to simplify controlling a plotter. AGL commands describe the desired graphics plotting function, which the computer relays as several HP-GL instructions to the plotter.

== See also ==
- DMPL, another plotter language by Houston Instruments
- Gerber format is another plot-description format
- Logo, a computer language with drawing commands similar to HP-GL
