= HOOPS Visualize =

Cross-platform CAD files viewer

- Developer(s): Tech Soft 3D
- Stable release: 2022
- Written in: C++, C#
- Operating system: Microsoft Windows 10, Linux (CentOS 7 / RHEL 7 / glibc 2.17), macOS 10.9, iOS 11.0, Android (operating system) 5.1, Xamarin
- Platform: x86, x86-64, ARM64, armeabi-v7a, arm64-v8a
- Type: 3D computer graphics
- License: Proprietary software
- Website: www.techsoft3d.com/products/hoops/visualize/

HOOPS Visualize is a 3D computer graphics software designed to render graphics across both mobile and desktop platforms. HOOPS Visualize provides 3D Graphics API to render CAD models. It's part of the HOOPS 3D Application Framework SDK. Since June 2018 it's licensed via Siemens PLM Software.

== History ==
The HOOPS 3D Graphics System was originally developed in the mid-1980s in the CADIF Lab at Cornell University. Ithaca Software later formed to commercialize the technology. Subsequently, HOOPS was widely adopted for Computer-Aided Design (CAD), Computer-Aided Manufacturing (CAM) and Computer-Aided Engineering (CAE) software.

In 1993, Autodesk, Inc. acquired Ithaca Software. In 1996, HOOPS was spun out of Autodesk by Tech Soft 3D, Inc., which continues to develop and sell the HOOPS 3D Graphics System under the name HOOPS Visualize. The software is made available free of charge to educational institutions.

== Overview ==
The program features a unified API that allows users to add interactive 3D visualization to both desktop and mobile applications. HOOPS Visualize provides a hierarchical scene management engine capable of handling a range of graphics entities, together with a graphics pipeline and interaction handling algorithms. It includes clash detection, multi-plane sectioning, and large model visualization, along with many other features.

Features include:

- Retained-mode graphics system with a supporting database
- Data is structured hierarchically in a scene graph
- Able to use many different contexts for rendering, including DirectX, OpenGL, as well as software and hardcopy
- Interfaces with C, C++, C#, and Java
- Out-of-core rendering mode for visualizing large point-cloud datasets
- Integrates with other engineering SDKs like ACIS, Parasolid, RealDWG, and HOOPS Exchange, as well as industry standard CAD formats
- PMI support, mark-up, model trees, point clouds
- Compatible with all major graphical user interfaces
- Platform independent input architecture

== Technical Overview ==
Internally it uses OpenGL or DirectX (Windows). Tech Soft 3D has developed its own framework for event handling.

The graphics kernel (Core Graphics) is based on the hierarchichal scene graph data structures.

== File formats ==
Supported file formats
File format	Imports	Exports	Notes
HSF	Yes	Yes	HOOPS Stream File
OBJ	Yes	Partial	Limited export
STL	Yes	No	
PTS/PTX/XYZ	Yes	?	
Parasolid	Yes	?	All file formats supported by Kernel
Autodesk RealDWG	Yes	?	All file formats supported by SDK
PostScript	No	Yes	
PDF	No	Yes	
DXT1	No	Yes	
DXT3	No	Yes	
DXT5	No	Yes	
JPG	No	Yes	
PNG	No	Yes	
TGA	No	Yes	
RGB	No	Yes	
RGBA	No	Yes	
ARGB	No	Yes	
Grayscale	No	Yes	
Mapped8	No	Yes	
