= Design Web Format =

Type of file format

- Filename extensions: .dwf, .dwfx
- Internet media type: model/vnd.dwf
- Developed by: Autodesk
- Initial release: 1995; 31 years ago
- Type of format: CAD

Design Web Format (DWF) is a file format developed by Autodesk for the efficient distribution and communication of rich design data to anyone who needs to view, review, or print design files. Because DWF files are highly compressed, they are smaller and faster to transmit than design files, without the overhead associated with complex CAD drawings (or the management of external links and dependencies). With DWF functionality, publishers of design data can limit the specific design data and plot styles to only what they want recipients to see and can publish multisheet drawing sets from multiple AutoCAD drawings in a single DWF file. They can also publish 3D models from most Autodesk design applications.

DWF files are not a replacement for native CAD formats such as AutoCAD drawings (DWG). The sole purpose of DWF is to allow designers, engineers, project managers, and their colleagues to communicate design information and design content to anyone needing to view, review, or print design information – without these team members needing to know AutoCAD or other design software.

An Autodesk DWF advocate blog cites as DWF's strengths over alternatives that the files have very high mathematical precision, and contain meta-data for sheets, objects and markup data. Another significant strength is that comments and markup can be reintroduced to, and edited in, some Autodesk products, such as Revit and AutoCAD.

The AutoCAD file format (.dwfx) is based on ISO/IEC 29500-2:2008 Open Packaging Conventions.

== Technology ==
DWF is a file format developed by Autodesk for representing design data in a manner that is independent of the original application software, hardware, and operating system used to create that design data. A DWF file can describe design data containing any combination of text, graphics, and images in a device independent and resolution independent format. These files can be one sheet or multiple sheets, very simple or extremely complex with a rich use of fonts, graphics, color, and images. The format also includes intelligent metadata that captures the design intent of the data being represented.

The DWF technology centers on three components:

- C++ libraries for developers
- a viewer for project team members who wish to view design data without knowing AutoCAD
- a writer that allows anyone to create a DWF file from any application

=== DWF Toolkit ===
DWF is an open file format. Autodesk publishes the DWF specification and makes available C++ libraries (not available anymore) for any developer who wants to build applications around the DWF format, with the DWF Toolkit. Furthermore, DWF is based on other industry standards such as ZLIB, XML, and common image formats.

DWF files (since version 6.0) are a ZIP-compressed container for the drawing files; despite the first few bytes of the file containing a DWF header, renaming a .dwf file to .zip will allow the component files inside to be viewed with archive compression software. Amongst various XML and binary files, is a PNG format thumbnail preview.

DWF can be interfaced with .NET Libraries.

=== Design Review ===
Autodesk Design Review is a free viewing application that enables all members of the project team to easily view, measure, markup and print designs shared electronically. Built around the DWF file format, Design Review enables users to view and print complex 2D and 3D drawings, maps, and models published from Autodesk design applications or from the DWF Writer.

Also, all Markups and Annotations created in Design Review can be imported to the original file when using Autodesk applications, such as AutoCAD, Inventor or Revit Architectural. This feature makes DWF the ideal format for design reviewing and collaboration processes.

Although an Autodesk representative stated on the Official Autodesk user Forums in September 2013 that the application would be discontinued, an update to Autodesk Design Review was released in 2017.

=== DWF Writer ===
Autodesk DWF Writer software publishes the DWF format from CAD applications that do not offer built-in DWF publishing, such as Bentley MicroStation or Dassault's Solidworks software. Autodesk DWF Writer is a Windows printer driver that converts files to DWF format. The result is that the entire project team can standardize on a common file format to exchange and review designs and sheet sets, at no additional cost.

=== Freewheel ===
In 2007, Autodesk introduced an online translator for DWFs called Freewheel. Freewheel was a way to view a DWF file without downloading software. It was also a web service which offered developers a web-based interface for viewing, querying, and manipulating DWF files. Freewheel has been replaced by the web based viewing and editing web service Autodesk 360.

=== Platforms ===
Autodesk's DWF viewers (except for Freewheel) are all based on Microsoft Windows. The DWF Toolkit is available on Microsoft Windows, Linux, and Mac OS X.

== History ==
The DWF format first appeared in 1995 as part of the unveiling of Autodesk's "WHIP!" Netscape Navigator plug-in. The format was originally referred to as the Drawing Web Format, since DWF files were generated by the Autodesk Internet Publishing Kit. As the format grew in use beyond just AutoCAD, it was renamed to Design Web Format. Although originally a 2D-only format, DWF has evolved to include 3D. Today DWF files are generated by all Autodesk products. In addition, there are a variety of third-party applications that make use of the format.

== Alternatives ==
PDF is an internationally recognized open file format developed by Adobe Systems to allow electronic exchange of any printable document, independent of the source application software, hardware and operating system. PDF/E is a subset of v1.6 of the PDF specification specifically designed for engineering use.

SVG (Scalable Vector Graphics) is an open, XML based file format. It is suitable for use both as a format for creating and editing drawings and as a format for viewing and publication. For instance, Inkscape uses SVG as its native format, and both the Firefox and Opera browsers natively display SVG.

== See also ==
- Computer-aided design (CAD)
- DWG
- DXF
- PDF
- PDF/E
- Electronic paper (Epaper: Portable Drawing)
- Scalable Vector Graphics (SVG)
