= DGN =

CAD file format

DGN (design) is the name used for CAD file formats supported by Bentley Systems, MicroStation and Intergraph's Interactive Graphics Design System (IGDS) CAD programs. The DGN format is used in construction projects, including buildings, highways, bridges, process plants, shipbuilding. DGN is a competing format to Autodesk's DWG.

== Versions ==
There are two versions of DGN:

- Intergraph Standard File Formats (ISFF) specification, published in the late 1980s by Intergraph. This is sometimes referred to as V7 DGN, or Intergraph DGN.
- In 2000, Bentley Systems created an updated version of DGN which includes a superset of DGN's capabilities, but which has a different internal data structure to the ISFF-based DGN. This version is properly referred to as V8 DGN.

== History ==
In 2003 OpenDWG™ Alliance (now Open Design Alliance), a non-profit industry consortium committed to promoting open industry-standard formats for the exchange of CAD data, and Bentley Systems, Incorporated, announced that the Alliance will support V8 DGN. Bentley increased its membership level to become the Alliance's first supporting member. The Open Design Alliance provides Teigha for .dgn files (old name is DGNdirect) - a development platform available using C++ that is used with .dgn files and other graphics files.

In 2008 Autodesk and Bentley agreed on exchange of software libraries, including Autodesk RealDWG, to improve the ability to read and write the companies' respective DWG and DGN formats in mixed environments with greater fidelity. In addition, the two companies were to facilitate work process interoperability between their AEC applications through supporting the reciprocal use of available application programming interfaces (APIs).
