= List of 3D rendering software =

3D rendering software products are the dedicated engines used for rendering computer-generated imagery. This is not the same as 3D modeling software, which involves the creation of 3D models, for which the software listed below can produce realistically rendered visualisations.General-purpose packages which can have their own built-in rendering capabilities are not listed here; these can be found in the list of 3D computer graphics software and list of 3D animation software. See 3D computer graphics software for more discussion about the distinctions.

| Title | License | Status | Developer(s) |
|---|---|---|---|
| 3Delight | Proprietary | Active | Illumination Research (company) |
| Arion | Proprietary | Active | RandomControl |
| Aqsis | BSD | Active | Paul Gregory |
| Arnold | Proprietary | Active | Solid Angle, Autodesk, Sony Pictures Imageworks |
| Blue Moon Rendering Tools | Proprietary | Discontinued | Exluna, acquired by NVIDIA |
| Brazil R/S | Proprietary | Discontinued | SplutterFish LLC |
| C3D Vision | Proprietary | Active | ASCON, C3D Labs |
| Chaos Corona | Proprietary | Active | Chaos |
| Enscape | Proprietary | Active | Enscape GmbH |
| Gelato | Proprietary | Discontinued | Nvidia Corporation |
| iClone | Proprietary | | Reallusion |
| Kerkythea | Freeware | | Ioannis Pantazopoulos |
| Keyshot | Proprietary | Active | Luxion Inc |
| Lumion | Proprietary | Active | Lumion Software |
| LuxCoreRender | Apache-2.0 | Active | Jean-Philippe Grimaldi (lead) |
| Maxwell Render | Proprietary | | Next Limit Technologies |
| Mental ray | Proprietary | Discontinued | Nvidia Corporation |
| MoonRay | Apache-2.0 | Active | DreamWorks |
| Nvidia Advanced Rendering Center | Proprietary | Active | Mental Images acquired by NVIDIA |
| Octane Render | Proprietary | Active | OTOY Inc. |
| RenderMan | Proprietary | Active | Pixar |
| Rhino Render | Proprietary | Active | Rhinoceros 3D - Robert McNeel & Associates |
| POV-Ray | AGPLv3 | Active | The POV-Team |
| Radiance | Free and open-source | Active | Greg Ward |
| Redshift | Proprietary | Active | Maxon |
| SolidWorks Visualize | Proprietary | Active | Dassault Systèmes |
| Substance 3D Stager | Proprietary | Active | Adobe Inc. |
| Sunflow | MIT | Inactive | Christopher Kulla |
| Unigine | Proprietary free for non commercial use | Active | UNIGINE Company |
| V-Ray | Proprietary | Active | Chaos |

== See also ==
- Comparison of computer-aided design software
- List of 3D computer graphics software
- List of 3D animation software
- List of 3D modeling software
- Rendering engine
- CAD library - cloud based repository of 3D models, textures, HDRIs, or assets.
