= Brazil R/S =

Defunct proprietary plugin for 3D modelling software

- Developer(s): SplutterFish LLC
- Initial release: 1.0 / September 3, 2002; 22 years ago
- Final release: 2.0 / November 29, 2007; 17 years ago
- Preview release: 3.0 beta / August 9, 2011; 13 years ago
- Type: Rendering system
- License: Proprietary
- Website: www.splutterfish.com

PowerVR Brazil SDK
- Developer(s): Imagination Technologies
- Final release: 1.1
- Platform: OpenRL
- Type: Rendering system
- License: Proprietary
- Website: www.caustic.com

Brazil Rendering System was a proprietary commercial plugin for 3D Studio Max, Autodesk VIZ and Rhinoceros 3D. Steve Blackmon and Scott Kirvan started developing Brazil R/S while working as the R&D team of Blur Studio, and formed the company SplutterFish to sell and market Brazil. It was capable of photorealistic rendering using fast ray tracing and global illumination.

It was used by computer graphics artists to generate content for print, online content, broadcast solutions and feature films. Some major examples are Star Wars: Episode III – Revenge of the Sith, Sin City, Superman Returns and The Incredibles.

Imagination Technologies announced Brazil's end-of-life, effective May 14, 2012.

== PowerVR Brazil SDK ==
Caustic Visualizer
- Developer(s): Imagination Technologies
- Final release: 1.3
- Platform: Maya, SketchUp
- Type: Rendering system
- License: Proprietary
- Website: www.getvisualizer.com

Neon
- Developer(s): Robert McNeel & Associates
- Final release: 1.0 SR1 / May 17, 2013; 12 years ago
- Platform: Rhinoceros 3D
- Type: Rendering system
- License: Proprietary
- Website: v5.rhino3d.com/group/neon

Splutterfish was acquired by Caustic Graphics in 2008 (which was later acquired by Imagination Technologies in December 2010.)

After Splutterfish's acquisition by Caustic Graphics, they began a rewrite of Brazil r/s using Caustic's OpenRL API to leverage Caustic's raytracing hardware. The new render engine was initially publicly called the "Brazil 3.0 SDK" but was later renamed the "PowerVR Brazil SDK".)

The PowerVR Brazil SDK was used in Caustic Visualizer, a real-time rendering plugin for Maya and SketchUp, and Neon, a viewport rendering plugin for Rhinoceros 3D. Caustic Visualizer for Maya and R2100/R2500 hardware were EOLed on June 13, 2014 and Caustic Visualizer for SketchUp was EOLed on March 23, 2015.

In 2015 Imagination Technologies introduced the PowerVR Wizard GPU architecture, that integrated Imagination's hardware raytracing cores. Wizard replaced the OpenRL API with vendor-specific OpenGL ES raytracing extensions. The Brazil SDK, using its internal name 'Resin', was updated to demo the new architecture.
