= Arturo Tedeschi =

Italian architect and designer (born 1979)

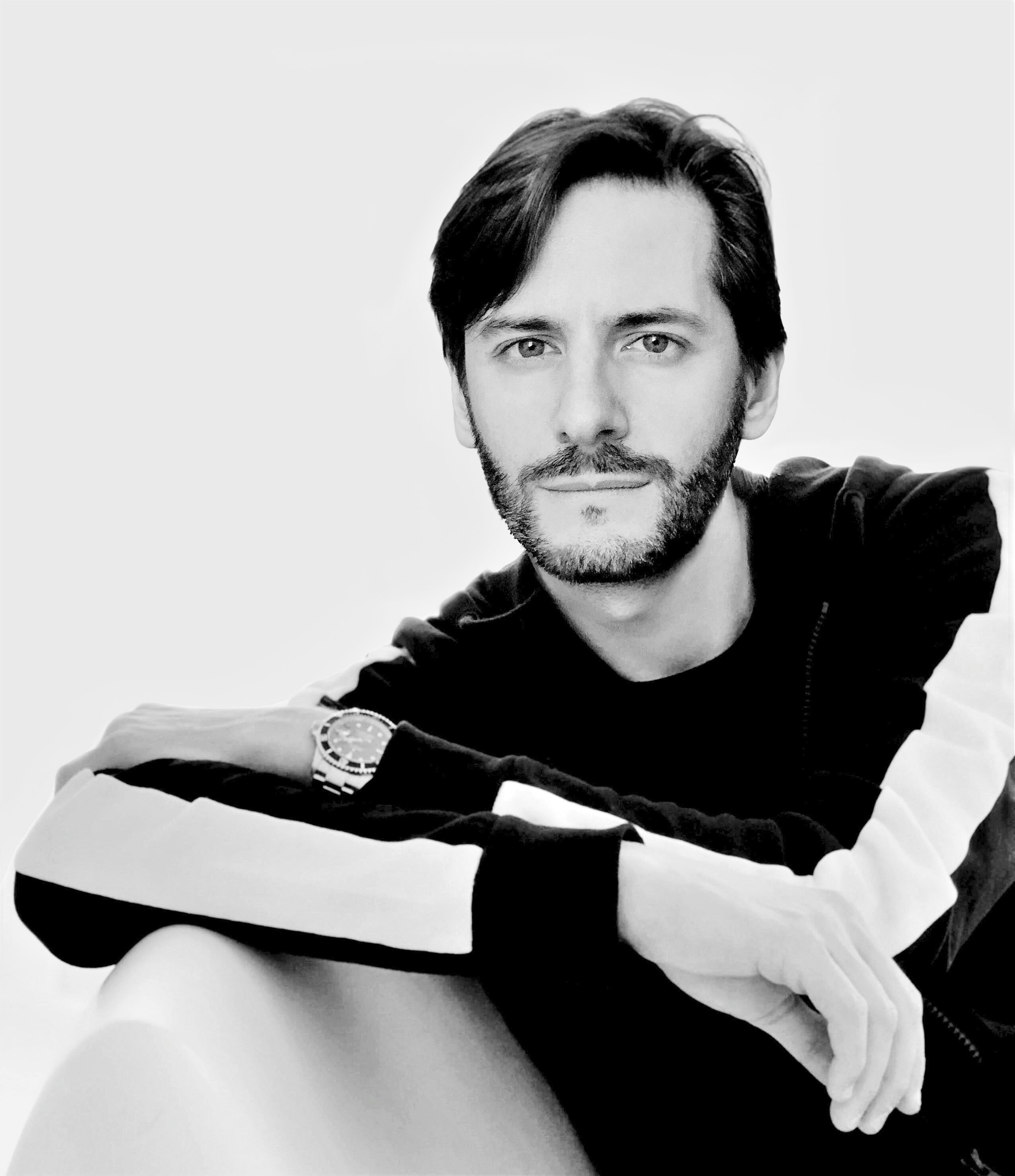
Arturo Tedeschi Self-portrait photograph

Arturo Tedeschi (born 24 April 1979) is an Italian architect, computational designer and writer. He's the founder of the homonymous architecture practice and design consulting which promotes a new kind of algorithmic-based design. His work includes techniques such as Algorithms-Aided Design (AAD), CNC milling, robotic milling, 3D printing, artificial intelligence, virtual reality. Arturo Tedeschi is the author of the books: Architettura Parametrica, Parametric Architecture with Grasshopper and AAD Algorithms-Aided Design, a reference book on algorithmic modelling based on the Grasshopper platform.

== Career ==
Arturo Tedeschi started his career in 2004, combining professional practice in Italy with a personal research on algorithms-aided design, focusing on relationships between architecture and emerging technologies. In 2010 he published Architettura Parametrica, a technical book on computational design translated into English as Parametric Architecture with Grasshopper. In the same year he worked at Zaha Hadid Architects in London. in 2011 he founds the studio arturotedeschi and began working both as a designer and consultant (architecture, furniture, fashion, footwear, automotive). Among his projects: NU:S Installation at Chiostro Del Bramante (Roma, 2012), Parametric Shoes (Roma, 2012) where 3D printing has been applied to fashion design, The CloudBridge (2013), Ilabo Shoes with Ross Lovegrove (Milano, 2015), In-Formation with Ross Lovegrove (Koln, 2017), Needle Watch (2017), Transmission at Victoria and Albert Museum with Ross Lovegrove (London, 2017), Fessura wall system (Milano, 2017), Alcantara Corner Lounges for Audi with Lovegrove and Colombo (Milano, 2017), Oyster Chair (Milano, 2018), Iris Concept Car (2020), Passerella, a new tram for Milano (2020), HorizON suspension lamp for the Venice Glass Week 2020, Stage set for Illenium World Tour (2023), Architect wristwatch collection for Mauron Musy. In 2014 he published AAD Algorithms-Aided Design. In 2019 he has been appointed Italian Design Ambassador for the Sydney Design festival within the Italian Design Day 2019

== Teaching ==
Arturo Tedeschi has been an invited lecturer at universities and conferences. He taught and lectured at Politecnico di Milano, Istituto Marangoni,Architectural Association School of Architecture in London, Parsons School of Design (New York), ISCTE-IUL Lisbon, University of Sydney, Dubai Institute of Design and Innovation, University of Edinburgh, IUAV Venezia, University of Arkansas Rome Center, Universidad Europea de Madrid.

== Writings ==
- 2010 – Architettura Parametrica – Introduzione a Grasshopper (I edizione italiana), Edizioni Le Penseur, ISBN 978-88-95315-04-1
- 2010 – Architettura Parametrica – Introduzione a Grasshopper (II edizione italiana), Edizioni Le Penseur, ISBN 978-88-95315-08-9
- 2011 – Parametric Architecture with Grasshopper, Edizioni Le Penseur, ISBN 978-88-95315-10-2
- 2014 – AAD Algorithms-Aided Design, Parametric Strategies using Grasshopper, Edizioni Le Penseur, ISBN 978-88-95315-30-0
- 2026 – AI Plot Twist, The revolution of artificial intelligence in architecture, Edizioni Le Penseur, ISBN 9791281552401
