= Parameter (disambiguation) =

A parameter is a quantity that changes characteristics of a system or a function.

Parameter may also refer to:

- Parameter (computer programming), special kind of variable
- Parameter (linguistics), a grammar rule that is variable across languages
- Parameters (journal), a journal of the U.S. Army War College
- In linguistics, see Principles and parameters
- Statistical parameter

== See also ==
- Natural parameter (disambiguation)
- Parametrization (disambiguation)
- Perimeter
