= Keyshot =

3D rendering program

KeyShot Studio
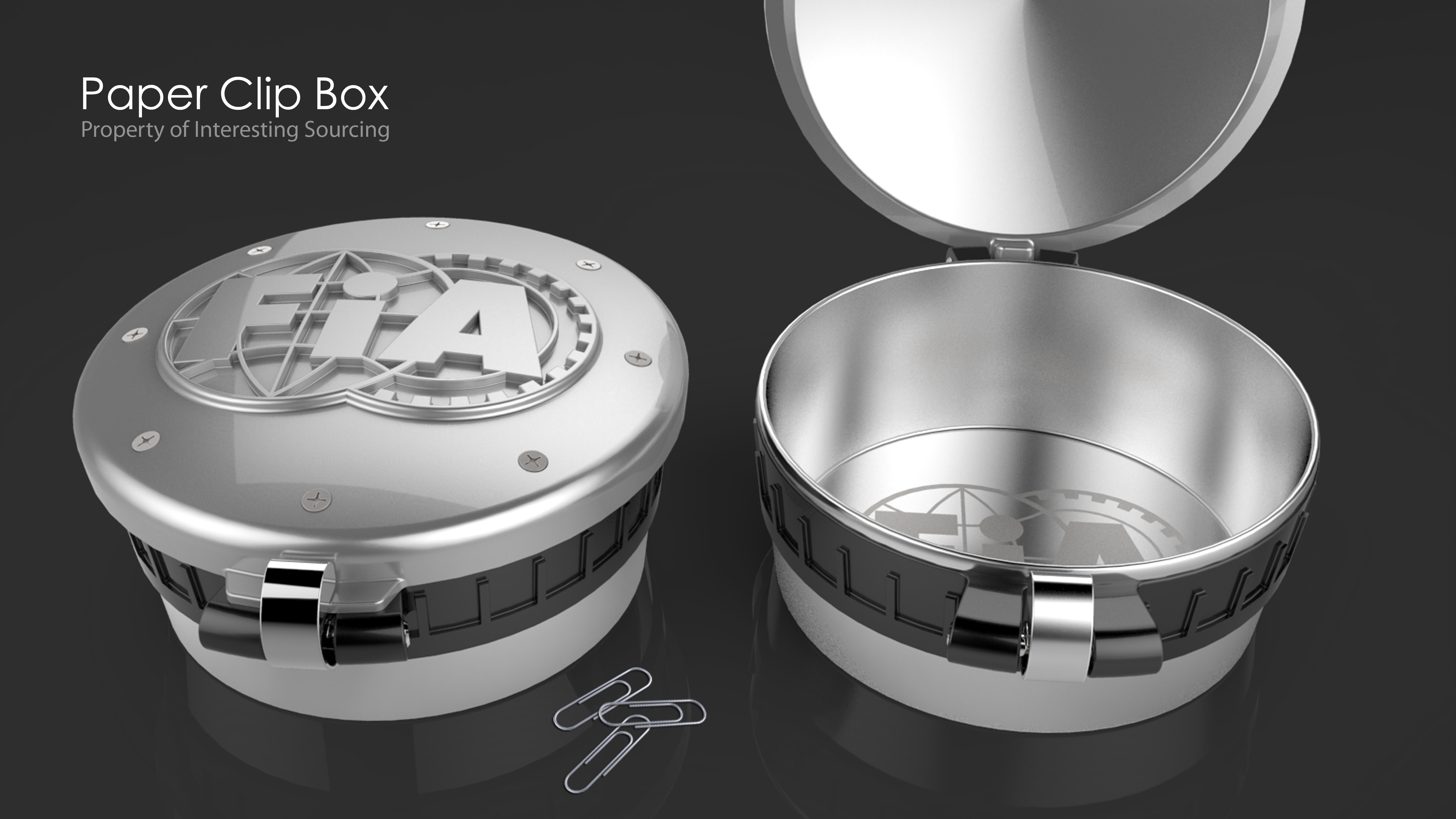
- 3D rendering in KeyShot from SolidWorks
- Developers: KeyShot, Inc.
- Initial release: 2007
- Written in: C++
- Operating system: Windows, macOS, Linux
- Available in: English
- Type: 3D rendering software
- License: Proprietary
- Website: www.keyshot.com

KeyShot (formerly Luxion, Inc.) is a 3D rendering company and developer of KeyShot Studio. KeyShot Studio is designed to create photorealistic images of 3D models quickly and easily. It is known for its intuitive user interface and real-time rendering capabilities, allowing users to see their changes immediately.

== History ==
KeyShot was first released by Bunkspeed in 2007, initially as Hypershot with licensed software from Luxion, Inc. Bunkspeed stopped paying that license fee, and in 2010, Luxion relaunched the software product itself as KeyShot.

Following the acquisition of Digizuite, a Digital Asset Management (DAM) software developer, in September 2023, the companies rebranded as KeyShot in July 2024. The KeyShot software was renamed KeyShot Studio, and the Digizuite software was renamed KeyShot Dock.

== About ==
KeyShot is a rendering software used mostly by professionals from various domains, but mostly used by designers, artists and engineers. This professionals rely on Keyshot due to its powerful and fast rendering capacities. What distinguish KeyShot from other rendering software is that it is processor-based, meaning the rendering calculations executed are CPU-based. This enables the user to have a regular graphic card while still being able to achieve high resolution renders.

== Features ==
=== Material and surface appearance ===
The KeyShot material library counts over 750 different material that can be applied to the solid by a simple drag-and-drop command. The material library is divided into folder categories based on the nature of the material : metals, plastics, fabrics, and more. When selecting a category or folder of material, the software provides a preview of a sample appearance of each material for the user to be able to see the textures and finishes. The library also has a search field to type in the name of the material needed for quicker finds. Additionally, the user is able to import other materials to the software as long as the material file type is supported by KeyShot.

The software also provides various textures to apply to the solid that can be found in the texture library, organized by the same principle as the material library. These textures can be set as diffuse, bump, specular and opacity, and each of these setting make the appearance of the texture vary depending on the product's needs. The textures can also be mapped on a surface and sized on a specific region of the object with the help of the user friendly arrow system.

Both textures and material appearance can be adjusted and tailored to the user's needs by accessing the material menu, where settings for colors, light reflections and surface roughness can all be set manually.

=== Lighting ===
KeyShot offers a wide range of lighting options to create an effective and realistic studio setting. The lighting can be set to different focus point determined by the user. It is also possible to insert light point or adding light sources by the means of adding solid shapes and selecting them as light areas. Multiple users refer themselves to KeyShot when it comes to lighting capacities in renderings from its fast and high quality results.

=== Environments ===
On top of selected lighting, KeyShot provides various environment possibilities in the environment library, where the scenes/settings are lit with HDRIs, giving a more realistic look to the renders. This method of selecting a studio where all the lights have already been set up in an optimal way saves a lot of time and makes for an effective and beginner friendly process. Within the environment library, the user will have a wide range of environment setting depending on the context needed, for example: studio lights, outdoors, indoors and more. The background is also adjustable: the user controls the colors, shadows and can even embed a backplate image to put the product in a lifestyle setting.

=== Camera and view angles ===
KeyShot offers multiple view settings for the target product. The camera can be placed physically in space by the user, or adjusted with specific settings such as: distance, azimuth, inclination and twist. These variables are adjustable by giving them specific values to achieve the ideal view angle. Also, the product being rendered can be set as the view target to enable quicker and more focused views. The camera comes with a lens setting, where the perspective can be increased or diminished, as well as removed completely in need of orthographic views.

=== Animation ===
KeyShot enables the user to create animations of the product by either moving the parts and components while having a fixed camera, by moving the camera in a predetermined fluid path around the object, or both. KeyShot makes the animation task straight forward, fast and simple for its users by having a minimal step by step sequence allowing for great animation movements. These permit clear and understandable exploded views showing technical details, as well as dynamic shots for better views of the object in movement using the path and camera animation.

- Real-time rendering
- Material library - textures, bump maps, and HDRIs.
- Animation
- Drag and drop - textures, materials, and HDRIs.

== 3D file formats supported ==
See also: List of 3D file formats

- 3ds Max (.max) (Windows Only)
- Adobe Swatch Exchange (.ase)
- ALIAS (.wire)
- AutoCAD (.dwg, .dxf)
- CATIA v5-6 R2022x (R32) and prior (.cgr, .catpart, .catproduct, .catdrawing)
- Cinema 4D S26 and prior (.c4d)
- Creo 9.0 and prior (.prt, .asm) (Windows Only)
- Creo View (.pvz, .pvs, .edz, .ed, .c3di, .ol) (Windows Only)
- Inventor 2023 and prior (.ipt, .iam)
- Maya (.ma, .mb)
- NX 12 and prior (.prt) NX
- Onshape
- Pro/ENGINEER Wildfire 2-5 (.prt, .asm)
- Revit (.rvt)
- Rhinoceros 7 and prior (.3dm)
- SketchUp (.skp)
- Solid Edge (.par, .asm, .psm)
- SOLIDWORKS (.sldprt, .sldasm)
- ACIS (.sat)
- Alembic (.abc)
- 3DS (.3ds)
- 3MF (.3mf)
- 3DXML (.3dxml)
- Collada (.dae)
- FBX (.fbx)
- GLB/glTF (.glb, .gltf)
- IGES (.igs, .iges)
- JT 10.7 and prior (.jt)
- OBJ (.obj)
- Parasolid 34.1 and prior (.x_t)
- STEP (.stp, .step)
- .STL (.stl)
- USD (.usd, .usda, .usdc, .usdz)

== See also ==
- List of 3D rendering software
- Non-uniform rational B-spline
