= Enscape =

Computer graphics software plugin

- Developer: Chaos
- Initial release: 2015
- Operating system: Windows, macOS
- License: commercial
- Website: https://www.chaos.com

Enscape is a commercial real-time rendering and virtual reality plugin. It is mainly used in the architecture, engineering, and construction fields for real-time visualization, interactive design reviews, and client communication. It is developed and maintained by Chaos, whose headquarters are based in Karlsruhe, Germany.

In 2022, Enscape's developer, Enscape GmbH, merged with Chaos, developer of the rendering software V-Ray.

== Overview ==
The main focus of Enscape lies in the calculation of realistic visualizations of architecture with low operating complexity. A real-time method is applied to achieve higher iteration speeds at the planning project by reducing waiting times. The respective CAD model is used, for example, to derive a virtual reality simulation.

Enscape uses OpenGL 4.4 and Vulkan and provides photorealistic representations of the underlying CAD models. With the help of a path-tracing procedure and physically based material models, the global illumination can be visualized realistically.

The following design solutions are currently supported:

- Revit
- SketchUp
- Rhinoceros 3D
- ArchiCAD
- Vectorworks
- ReluxDesktop

== Special Features of the Renderer ==
- Enscape is based on the self-developed renderer optimized for architectural visualization
- GPU controlled rendering technologies are used to display all architectural project sizes without loss of detail (e.g. by LOD [level of detail])
- Hybrid ray tracing to simulate physically correct indirect lighting and reflection, combining image-based screen space techniques with BVH based global data structures
- Global lighting calculations can thus be performed very quickly and largely independently of the complexity of the project
- Real-time rendering: Design changes can be viewed instantly, in one workflow, through a rendering window linked to the live model.
- Bi-directional sync: Updates can be seen instantly in Enscape and in the original scene. Changes made in the model or in Enscape sync both ways.
- AI-powered ideation: Creative directions can be explored with the Veras integration.
- AI-enhanced scene enrichment: Scenes can be enhanced and adjusted for higher-quality and more accurate visuals.
- AI image upscaler: Low-resolution drafts or renders can be upscaled up to 16K.
