= Algorithms-Aided Design =

Design technique

Algorithms-Aided Design (AAD) is the use of specific algorithms-editors to assist in the creation, modification, analysis, or optimization of a design. The algorithms-editors are usually integrated with 3D modeling packages and read several programming languages, both scripted or visual (RhinoScript, Grasshopper, MEL, C#, Python). The Algorithms-Aided Design allows designers to overcome the limitations of traditional CAD software and 3D computer graphics software, reaching a level of complexity which is beyond the human possibility to interact with digital objects. The acronym appears for the first time in the book AAD Algorithms-Aided Design, Parametric Strategies using Grasshopper, published by Arturo Tedeschi in 2014.
