= Parametrization =

Parametrization, also spelled parameterization, parametrisation or parameterisation, is the process of defining or choosing parameters.

Parametrization may refer more specifically to:

- Parametrization (geometry), the process of finding parametric equations of a curve, surface, etc.
  - Parametrization by arc length, a natural parametrization of a curve
- Parameterization theorem or S m
  n theorem, a result in computability theory
- Parametrization (atmospheric modeling), a method of approximating complex processes

== See also ==
- Parameter (disambiguation)
- Parametric design – Engineering design method
- All pages with titles containing Parametrization (or a spelling variant)
