= Chaos Corona =

Computer image rendering software

- Other names: Corona Renderer (formerly)
- Original author(s): Ondřej Karlík; Adam Hotový; Jaroslav Křivánek
- Developer(s): Chaos Czech; Chaos
- Initial release: 2009
- Middleware: Autodesk 3ds Max, Maxon Cinema 4D
- Operating system: Windows, OS X
- Type: rendering engine
- Website: chaos.com/corona

Chaos Corona is a computer-generated imagery 3D rendering software developed by Chaos Czech, a subsidiary of Chaos. It was created by Ondřej Karlík as a student project in 2009 and was developed by a Prague-based company Render Legion under the name Corona Renderer. In 2017, Chaos Group acquired Render Legion, later rebranding the company to Chaos Czech. In 2022, Corona Renderer was rebranded to Chaos Corona.

It's commonly used for architectural visualization. Corona is provided as a plug-in for Autodesk 3ds Max and Maxon Cinema 4D, and a standalone GUI-less application. Chaos Corona is a CPU-based rendering engine that can perform both biased and unbiased rendering and is sometimes used as a benchmark tool to measure CPU performance in multi-threaded workloads.

== History ==
Corona Renderer was created in 2009 by Ondřej Karlík. By that time, GPU renderers were on the rise, but he considered that CPU rendering has great potential. He started the development as a solo student project at the Czech Technical University in Prague. He was later joined by a former CGI artist Adam Hotový, and Jaroslav Křivánek, associate professor and researcher at the Charles University in Prague, and founded the company Render Legion. He planned to create Corona Renderer for Blender, but it was impossible to launch a commercial product due to the restrictive GNU GPL license, so the development focused on Autodesk 3ds Max. Corona was officially released in 2015 after 6 years of alpha development. In 2017, Render Legion was acquired by Chaos Group, and the 2022 version of Corona Renderer was rebranded to Chaos Corona. The Render Plugin Corna Renderer is also available for Cinema 4D.

== Overview ==
Corona is a CPU-based rendering engine that provides both biased and unbiased rendering options: using the path tracing engine gives an unbiased result, while using precomputations with a secondary engine increases processing time while making outcomes slightly biased. Corona also allows using GPU-based AI denoising instead of CPU denoising. Corona has three rendering options: Progressive (which refines the whole frame to the desired quality), Bucket (which makes numerous passes, refining the buckets where it's needed, notably reducing rendering time in scenes with large uniform areas), and BiDir/VCM mode (for scenes that need clear caustics). Corona supports interactive rendering, which allows one to implement and see changes in real-time, and distributed rendering, which utilizes the computational power of several devices in the network.

Corona includes a number of components and instruments to streamline 3D designers' and artists' workflows. For instance, Chaos Corona 8 (2022) includes Cosmos (a library of curated render-ready models with comprehensive materials, such as furniture, trees, cars, and people, as well as HDR sky images); materials library and materials editor; conversion tools that simplify import of scenes, lights, objects, and materials from V-Ray, Mental Ray, and finalRender; its own set of lights and a physical camera (which allows controlling ISO, aperture, shutter speed, depth of field, and focus distance); tools for plausibly randomized objects and effects placement; and so on.

== Editions ==
Corona is available as Autodesk 3ds Max (since 2009) and Maxon Cinema 4D (since 2019) plug-ins. The developers provide a free GUI-less Corona Standalone edition (since 2019) which is aimed at plug-in developers and comes with certain limitations. A community-made plug-in based on Corona Standalone allows integration with Blender.
