= Vectorworks =

US CAD software company

- Type: Subsidiary
- Industry: Software development
- Founded: 1985
- Founder: Richard Diehl
- Headquarters: Columbia, Maryland, United States
- Number of employees: 250
- Website: https://vectorworks.net

Vectorworks, Inc. is a U.S.-based software development company that focuses on CAD and BIM software for the architecture, engineering, and construction (AEC), landscape, and entertainment industries. Vectorworks is owned by the Nemetschek Group, a multinational company. It operates as an independent subsidiary of Nemetschek Group.

== History ==
The company was founded in 1985 as Graphsoft by Richard Diehl. Diehl later changed the name to Diehl Graphsoft. The first version of the company's software was named MiniCAD, designed for Apple Macintosh. Version 2.0, MiniCAD Plus was released in 1989 and allowed architects to model custom details similar to hand-drawn work. The software was subsequently rebranded as Vectorworks in the late 1990s.

In 2000, the company was acquired by the Nemetschek Group and became Nemetschek Vectorworks, Inc. It rebranded again in 2016 adopting its current name, Vectorworks. In 2015, Vectorworks announced it was acquiring the ESP Vision product line, to further enhance its stage lighting and pre-visualization software.

In April 2016, Biplab Sarkar was named the company's third CEO. Sarkar took over the position from Sean Flaherty, who assumed the role of Chief Strategy Officer on Nemetschek's supervisory board. That year, Vectorworks' annual software release for its CAD and BIM programs included updates and new features that were 70% based on customer feedback. That year, the company also introduced its Algorithms Aided Design (AAD) tool, Marionette.

In 2017, Vectorworks acquired Design Software Solutions Limited and opened a new office in the UK. In 2019, Vectorworks shared that its 2020 release would include live data visualization as well as games style level of detail (LoD) control.

In April 2019, Vectorworks became the first architectural software developer to receive the IFC4 Export Certification from buildingSMART International (bSI). With the certification, the developer meets export criteria for International Standard ISO-16739. Vectorworks further expanded its platforms in August 2019 by acquiring the ConnectCAD plug-in, for use with its AV installation software.

In 2020, Vectorworks released support for multi-core processing. The core processing for Vectorworks is handled by the Vectorworks Graphic Module (VGM), while the processing for external technologies connected to the company's software, like Enscape and Lumion, uses Vectorworks Graphic Sync (VGS).

Vectorworks hosts an annual Design Summit to allow users of its software to provide feedback, meet the company's developers, and learn about new developments and updates.In addition to receiving feedback in person, users have the option to choose whether they want to share their usage data with the company. Around one billion user interactions are logged daily by Vectorworks.

Vectorworks also licenses Pixar's OpenSubdiv library for 3D mesh modeling.

== Software ==
Vectorworks supports tight integration of all building elements, providing architects with Building Information Modeling (BIM). Vectorworks software utilizes Siemens' Parasolid modelling kernel to underpin its geometry creation. Users can choose from eight different options of the software: Landmark for landscape architecture and design, and site analysis; Spotlight for stage and lighting design; Fundamentals for basic 2D/3D modeling and documentation; Architect for conceptual design, construction documents, and fully coordinated BIM models; Braceworks for rigging analysis of temporary structures; Vision for lighting previsualization; ConnectCAD for signal flow designing; and Designer which provides Architect, Landmark, and Spotlight in one package. Vectorworks' software also includes the ability for customization using, Python, VectorScript, or the included algorithms aided design feature called Marionette.

== See also ==
- Architectural drawing
- List of BIM software
- List of CAD software
