= Ray tracing hardware =

Type of 3D graphics accelerator

Quake Wars: Ray Traced was rendered using Intel's now-cancelled Xeon Phi PCI 3.0 board.

Ray tracing hardware is application specific computer hardware designed for acceleration of ray tracing calculations, especially real-time raytracing of graphics for interactive applications.

== Ray tracing and rasterization ==
The problem of rendering 3D graphics can be conceptually presented as finding all intersections between a set of "primitives" (typically triangles or polygons) and a set of "rays" (typically one or more per pixel).

Up to the 2010s, mass market graphic acceleration boards, called graphics processing units (GPUs), used rasterization algorithms. The ray tracing algorithm solves the rendering problem in a different way. In each step, it finds all intersections of a ray with a set of relevant primitives of the scene.

Both approaches have their own benefits and drawbacks. Rasterization can be performed using devices based on a stream computing model, one triangle at the time, and access to the complete scene is needed only once. (Note: For additional visualizations such as shadows, or reflections such as produced by a large flat body of water, an addition pass of the scene graph is required for each effect.) The drawback of rasterization is that non-local effects, required for an accurate simulation of a scene, such as reflections and shadows are difficult; and refractions nearly impossible to compute.

The ray tracing algorithm is inherently suitable for scaling by parallelization of individual ray renders. However, anything other than ray casting requires recursion of the ray tracing algorithm (and random access to the scene graph) to complete their analysis, since reflected, refracted, and scattered rays require that various parts of the scene be re-accessed in a way not easily predicted. But it can easily compute various kinds of physically correct effects, providing much more realistic impression than rasterization. (Note: Rasterization methods are capable of generating realistic shadows (including shadows produced by partially transparent objects), and plane reflections easily (as of 2010), but do not easily implement reflections from non planar surfaces (excluding approximations using normal maps) or refractions.)

The complexity of a well implemented ray tracing algorithm scales logarithmically; (Note: That is if X is the number of triangles, then the number of computations to complete the scene is proportional to log(X).) this is due to objects (triangles and collections of triangles) being placed into BSP trees or similar structures, and only being analyzed if a ray intersects with the bounding volume of the binary space partition. (Note: The same methods can be used in rasterization; in a simplistic implementation, culling is limited to those BSP partitions that lie within the much larger viewing frustum (more advanced implementations including those that implement occlusion culling or predicated rendering scale better than linearly for complex (especially high occluded) scenes (note in common APIs: DirectX 10 D3D10_QUERY_OCCLUSION_PREDICATE , in OpenGL 3.0 HP_occlusion_query ). With ray tracing the viewing frustum is replaced by the volume enclosed by a single ray (or ray bundle).)

== Implementations ==
Various implementations of ray tracing hardware have been created, both experimental and commercial:

- (1995) Advanced Rendering Technology (ART) founded in Cambridge, UK, based on a 1994 PhD thesis, to produce dedicated ray tracing silicon (initially the "AR250" chip, which accelerated ray-triangle intersection, bounding box traversal and shading), using a "RenderDrive" networked accelerator for off-line rendering. Products were first shipped to customers in 1998. Software provided integration with Autodesk Maya and Max data formats, and utilized the Renderman scene description language for sending data to the processors (the .RIB or Renderman Interface Bytestream file format). The original AR250 was described as "the first time ray-tracing has been reduced to a single-chip design", achieving ray-tracing performance at "15 times the speed of a 266-MHz Pentium II processor". ART experienced difficulties at the turn of the century and was acquired by "ART VPS", co-founded by one of ART's founders. As of 2010, ART-VPS no longer produces ray tracing hardware but continues to produce rendering software.
- (1996) Researchers at Princeton university proposed using DSPs to build a hardware unit for ray tracing acceleration, named "TigerSHARK".
- (1999-2002) Implementations of volume rendering using ray tracing algorithms on custom hardware were carried out in 1999 by Hanspeter Pfister and researchers at Mitsubishi Electric Research Laboratories with the vg500 / VolumePro ASIC based system and in 2002 with FPGAs by researchers at the University of Tübingen with VIZARD II
- (2002) The computer graphics laboratory at Saarland University headed by Dr.-Ing. Philipp Slusallek has produced prototype ray tracing hardware including the FPGA based fixed function data driven SaarCOR (Saarbrücken's Coherence Optimized Ray Tracer) chip and a more advanced programmable (2005) processor, the Ray Processing Unit (RPU)
- (2009–2010) Intel showcased their prototype "Larrabee" GPU and Knights Ferry MIC, both built around x86 general-purpose manycore processors, at the Intel Developer Forum in 2009 with a demonstration of real-time raytracing.
- (2009) Caustic Graphics produced a plug in card, the "CausticOne", that accelerated global illumination and other ray based rendering processes when coupled to a PC CPU and GPU. The hardware is designed to organize scattered rays (typically produced by global illumination problems) into more coherent sets (lower spatial or angular spread) for further processing by an external processor.
- (2010-2011) Siliconarts developed a dedicated real-time ray tracing hardware (2010). RayCore, which is the world's first real-time ray tracing semiconductor IP, was announced in 2011.
- (2013) Imagination Technologies, after acquiring Caustic Graphics, produced the Caustic Professional's R2500 and R2100 plug in cards containing RT2 ray trace units (RTUs). Each RTU was capable of calculating up to 50 million incoherent rays per second.
- (2014) Imagination Technologies announced the PowerVR Wizard family and its first GR6500 implementation, a GPU for mobile and embedded uses with hardware-accelerated ray tracing and a dedicated ray-tracing unit (RTU).
- (2018, January) Nvidia, partnering with Microsoft DirectX, announced the Nvidia RTX developer library, which promised fast GPU software ray tracing solutions in the Volta-generation GPUs.
- (2018, September) Nvidia introduced their GeForce RTX and Quadro RTX GPUs, based on the Turing architecture, with hardware-accelerated ray tracing using a separate functional block, publicly called an "RT core". This unit is somewhat comparable to a texture unit in size, latency, and interface to the processor core. The unit features BVH traversal, compressed BVH node decompression, ray-AABB intersection testing, and ray-triangle intersection testing. The GeForce RTX 2080 and 2080 Ti became the first consumer-oriented brand of graphics card that can perform ray tracing in real time.
- (2020) AMD announced further information regarding the "refresh" of the RDNA micro-architecture. According to the company, the RDNA 2 micro-architecture supports real-time hardware accelerated ray tracing, consisting of BVH node decoding, ray-AABB intersection testing, and ray-triangle intersection testing.
- (2021) Imagination Technologies announced their IMG CXT GPU with hardware-accelerated ray tracing.
- (2022, January) Samsung announced their Exynos 2200 AP SoC with hardware-accelerated ray tracing based on the AMD RDNA2 GPU architecture.
- (2022, June) Arm announced their Immortalis-G715 with hardware-accelerated ray tracing.
- (2022, November) Qualcomm announced their Snapdragon 8 Gen 2 with hardware-accelerated ray tracing.
- (2022, December) Intel released the Arc Alchemist GPU, featuring ray tracing acceleration cores which perform comparatively with RTX 3000 series mid-range GPU.
- (2023) Apple announced their Apple A17 with hardware-accelerated ray tracing. A month later Apple announced the M3 chip family for Mac computers with support for hardware-accelerated ray tracing.

== See also ==
- Neural processing unit (NPU) – sometimes used to further accelerate the output from (real-time) ray tracing hardware
