= Google Building Maker =

Google Earth web application

Google Building Maker was a web application that allowed users to build three-dimensional buildings for inclusion in Google Earth. Buildings were created using simple three-dimensional shapes combined with aerial photos. Google reviewed new building submissions and included them in Google Earth's three-dimensional buildings layer when they were of sufficient quality and a better model did not already exist. Building models could be exported for editing in SketchUp. There were at least 127 cities available.

On 13 March 2013 Google announced that the Building Maker application would be retired on 1 June 2013; the cancellation became effective on 4 June.
