= Lumion =

3D Visualization software

- Developer: Act-3D B.V.
- Initial release: 2010
- Stable release: Lumion Pro 2025
- Operating system: Windows
- Type: 3D visualization
- License: Proprietary
- Website: lumion.com

Lumion is a real-time 3D architectural visualization software developed by Act-3D B.V., a privately owned Dutch company, developer of the Quest3D engine, headquartered in Sassenheim, Netherlands. Primarily used in architecture, landscaping, urban planning and interior design, Lumion allows the creation of high-resolution renders and visualizations. It is available in 180 countries worldwide.

== History ==
Act-3D, a company behind Lumion, was founded in 1998 in Leiden, Netherlands.

In September 2001, the company developed Quest3D, a proprietary 3D engine utilized in the areas of architecture, product design, computer games, training software, and simulation environments.

Act-3D shifted focus to architectural 3D rendering shortly after its inception. The first version of Lumion software was released in December 2010.

In April 2025, Lumion released Lumion Pro 2025, introducing AI-based image upscaling, expanded ray-traced effects such as water and volumetric lighting, a scene inspector, performance controls, and new nature assets created through photogrammetry.

In April of the same year, Lumion released Lumion View, a real-time visualization plugin for SketchUp that allows users to create ray-traced 4K renders directly within the modeling software.

In August 2025, Lumion announced the acquisition of Denmark-based startup Niimblr, which specializes in cloud-based collaboration, and rebranded it as Lumion Cloud. Bringing a visual-first collaboration solution to its ecosystem. Lumion Cloud enables architectural visualization professionals to upload files with seamless integration to Lumion View and Pro, and collect feedback from team members, clients and stakeholders.

In October 2025, Lumion released Lumion View for Revit plugin, offering the benefits of Lumion View to Autodesk Revit users.

== Overview ==
Lumion has Lumion View, Lumion Pro, and Lumion Cloud for commercial use. Lumion View is a lightweight, real-time rendering plugin that integrates with modelling applications (such as SketchUp and Revit) to support early-stage design review and fast visual feedback, while Lumion Pro is the full-featured desktop application that provides the advanced rendering tools and the complete content library for production-grade visualization. Lumion Studio is offered as a bundled subscription that combines the capabilities of both View and Pro.

Lumion Cloud, a web-based collaboration platform built for architects and designers, is currently free for all users with a Lumion Account.

Lumion also has two educational licenses for non-commercial use only: Lumion Student and Lumion Faculty. Lumion Student is a free 1-year license designed for students. It can be renewed throughout their studies and is intended for non-commercial use only. Lumion Faculty is a free 3-year license for faculty members representing educational institutions. Lumion Faculty is restricted to use on university computer labs only.

=== Features ===
Lumion offers real-time rendering, allowing users to view changes and updates instantly.

It also has integration with popular CAD software, such as Revit, SketchUp, AutoCAD, Archicad, and many more. Lumion LiveSync was introduced for the first time in 2018 for Sketchup, enabling real-time model-to-render synchronization.

LiveSync feature allows CAD modeling and Lumion rendering integration for simultaneous work in both environments with modifications that are instantly visible within the context of a lifelike landscape, including realistic skies, vegetation, furniture, and other rendered elements.

Lumion's render engine combines rasterization technology with ray tracing for realistic light behavior and automatically generates realistic indirect lighting, reflections, and shadows.

It is compatible with both Nvidia and AMD GPUs. It supports PBR material workflow, utilizing 8 material maps. Renders natural physical properties through the calculation of light conditions and gives control over the material settings.

== System requirements ==
Lumion's system requirements vary by version, generally recommending a powerful graphics card, sufficient RAM, and a high-speed processor for optimal performance. A benchmark test is available for individual assessment (Lumion benchmarks the user's computer graphics card, graphics memory, CPU, and system memory; if any of these components have a red score, the user may need to upgrade this component for a better Lumion use). System requirements also differ between the products: Lumion View is intended to run on lighter hardware as a plugin, while Lumion Pro requires a more powerful workstation (notably a fast graphics card and increased memory).
