= Chaos (company) =

Bulgarian software developer

- Type: Private
- Industry: Software
- Founded: 1997
- Founder: Peter Mitev; Vladimir Koylazov
- Headquarters: Karlsruhe, Germany; Sofia, Bulgaria
- Area served: Worldwide
- Key people: Iveta Cabajova (CEO)
- Products: Phoenix; V-Ray; Chaos Corona; Anima
- Number of employees: 950 (2022)
- Subsidiaries: See § Divisions and Subsidiaries
- Website: www.chaos.com

Chaos is a rendering and simulation software developer headquartered in Karlsruhe, Germany and Sofia, Bulgaria. It was founded in 1997 by Peter Mitev and Vladimir Koylazov as Chaos Group. Chaos is best known for the development of V-Ray. In 2022, it merged with Enscape, with the resulting company keeping the Chaos brand.

== History ==
Chaos was founded in 1997 in Sofia, Bulgaria as Chaos Group by Peter Mitev and Vladimir Koylazov. The company released its first product, fire and smoke simulation software Phoenix, then called Phoenix FD. In 2002, it released the first version of 3D rendering software V-Ray. In 2017, Vladimir Koylazov, then CTO of Chaos, received a Scientific and Engineering Award from the Academy of Motion Picture Arts and Sciences for his work on V-Ray. In 2021, Chaos went on to win an Engineering Emmy Award from the National Academy of Television Arts and Sciences for their work on it. Other products released by Chaos include Cosmos, Vantage, Scans and Cloud, most of them tying into V-Ray.

In 2017, the company acquired Czech software developer Render Legion, known for Corona Renderer, later rebranding the subsidiary to Chaos Czech. As part of a larger rebranding effort by Chaos, Corona Renderer was rebranded to Chaos Corona in 2022, bringing it in line with the rest of the company's products.

In 2021, the company rebranded from Chaos Group to Chaos. In January 2022, the company merged with German software developer Enscape, with the resulting company maintaining the Chaos brand.

Following the merger, Chaos acquired Danish 3D product visualization platform developer Cylindo in April. In May, the company acquired architectural visualization website CGarchitect, best known for their 3D Awards program. As part of the latter purchase, all paid features of the newly acquired website were made available to all accounts for free.

On July 11 2023, Chaos acquired Italian software developer AXYZ design, known for their crowd animation software anima and their range of stock 3D characters metropoly.
