= Natural parameter (disambiguation) =

In mathematics and related areas, a natural parameter or natural parameterization can refer to:

- The natural parameter of a differentiable curve, its arc length, and the natural parameterization representing points by a function of arc length
- The natural parameter of an exponential family of probability distributions, the function $\eta(\theta)$ over which the distribution is exponential
- The natural parameter in parameterized complexity, describing a computational problem that is parameterized by its output value

== See also ==
- Natural exponential family, an exponential family whose natural parameter is the identity function
- Natural parameter continuation, a method for solving nonlinear systems of equations by iterating from solutions on nearby parameter values
