= Modelur =

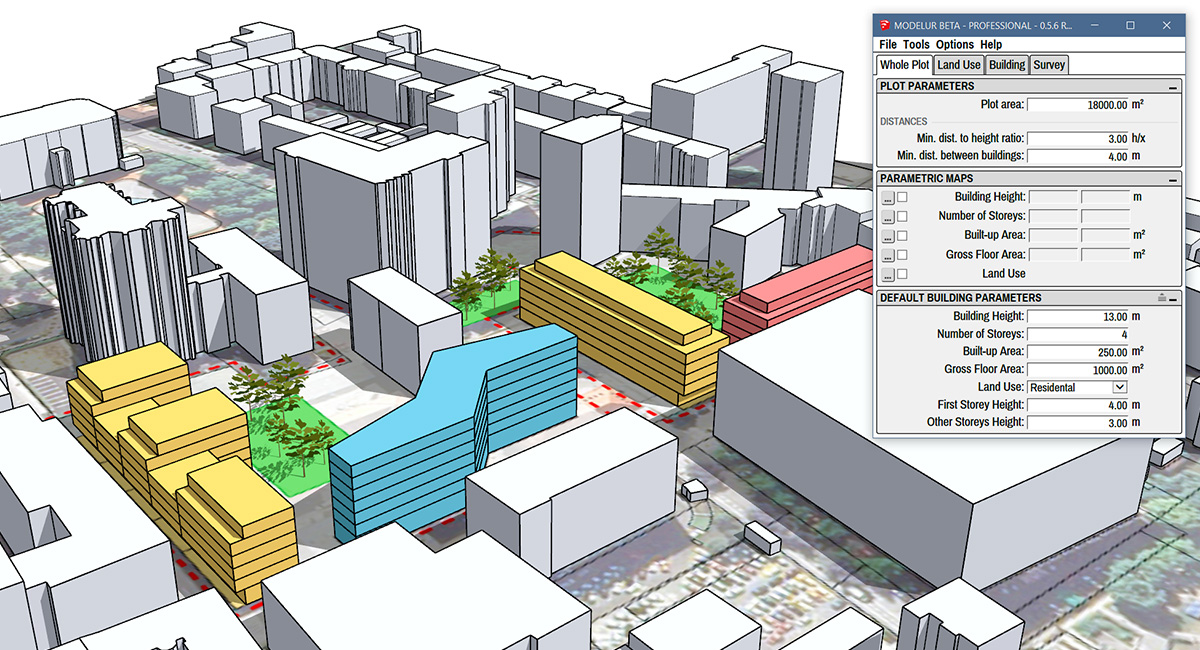
- Modelur Screenshot
- Developer: AgiliCity d.o.o.
- Release: April 2009
- Stable release: 2021.05.11 / May 17, 2021; 5 years ago
- Operating system: Windows, Mac OS X
- Available in: Chinese, Danish, Dutch, English, French, German, Polish, Portuguese, Slovenian, Spanish
- Type: 3D computer graphics, CAD
- License: Commercial
- Website: modelur.com

Modelur is a 3D parametric urban design software, implemented as a SketchUp plugin.

In contrast to common CAD applications, where the user designs buildings with usual dimensions such as width, depth, and height, Modelur offers the design of built environment through key urban parameters such as the number of storeys and gross floor area of a building. In addition, urban control values (i.e. Floor Space Index, Built-up Area, etc. ) and requirements (i.e. number of parking spaces or green areas) based on land use normatives are calculated in real-time.

== Sources ==
- Trimble SketchUp
- Modelur on SketchUp Extension Warehouse
- Modelur on YouTube
