= V-Ray =

Computer-generated imagery rendering software app

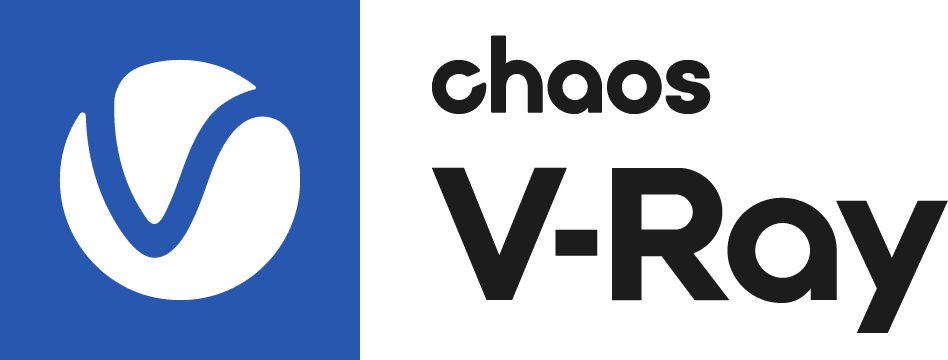

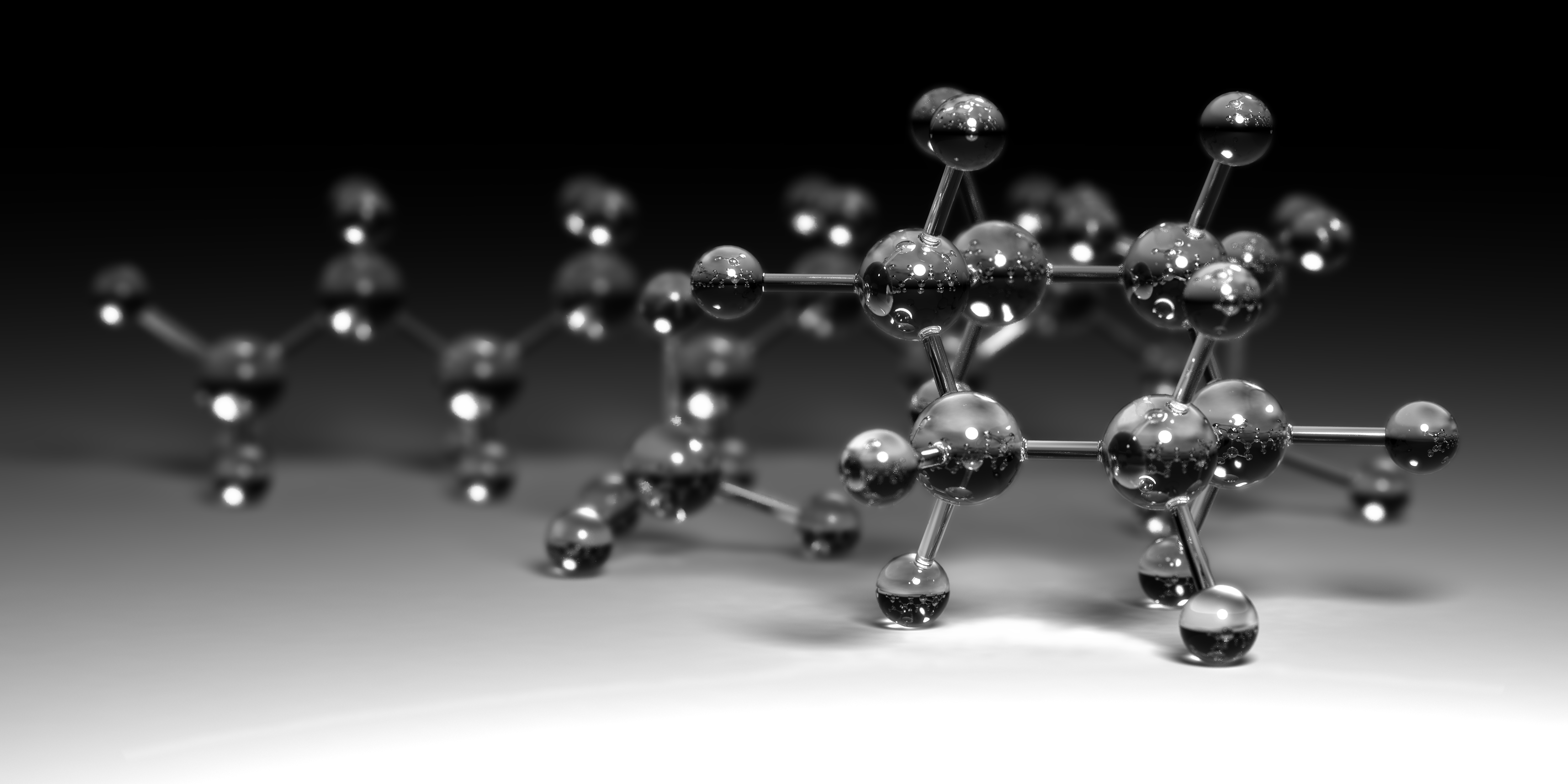
- Render created using V-Ray for Rhinoceros 3D, demonstrating the advanced effects V-Ray is capable of, such as refraction and caustics
- Developer: Chaos
- Release: 1997; 29 years ago
- Operating system: Linux, Mac OS X and Microsoft Windows
- Type: Rendering system
- License: Proprietary commercial software
- Website: www.chaos.com

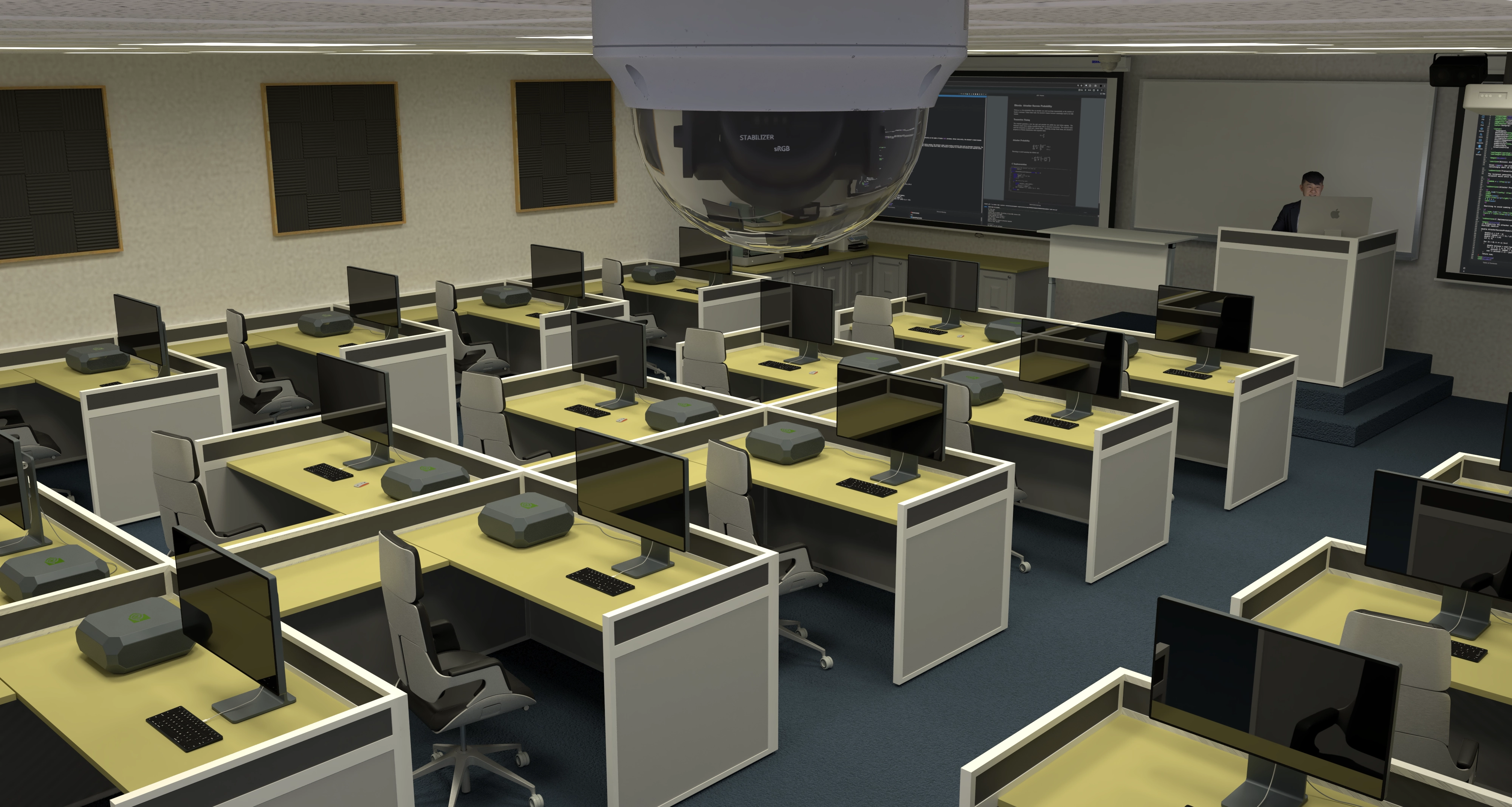
Computational education classroom with a security camera designed with SketchUp and rendered with V-Ray

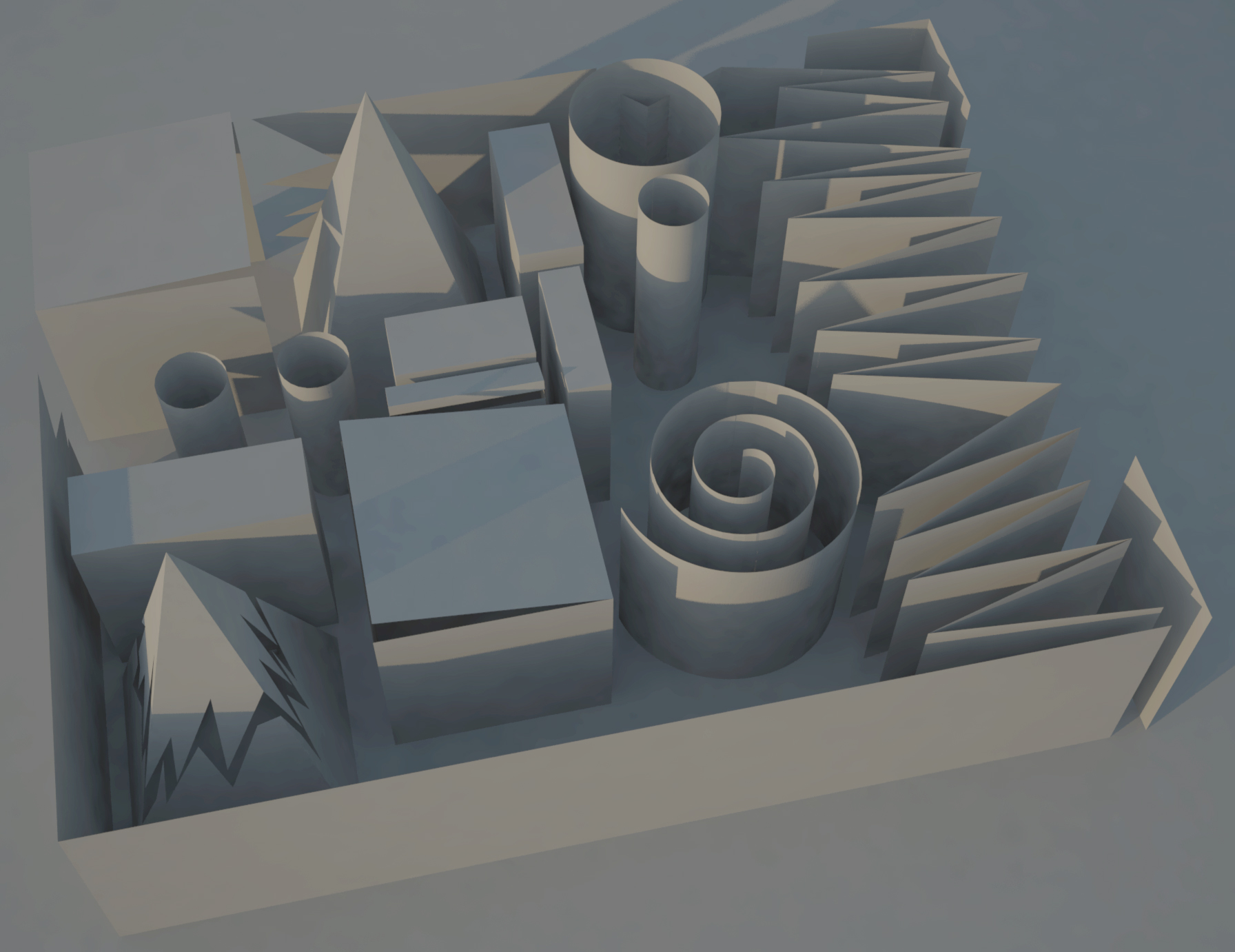
Folded paper: SketchUp drawing rendered using V-Ray, demonstrating shading and global illumination

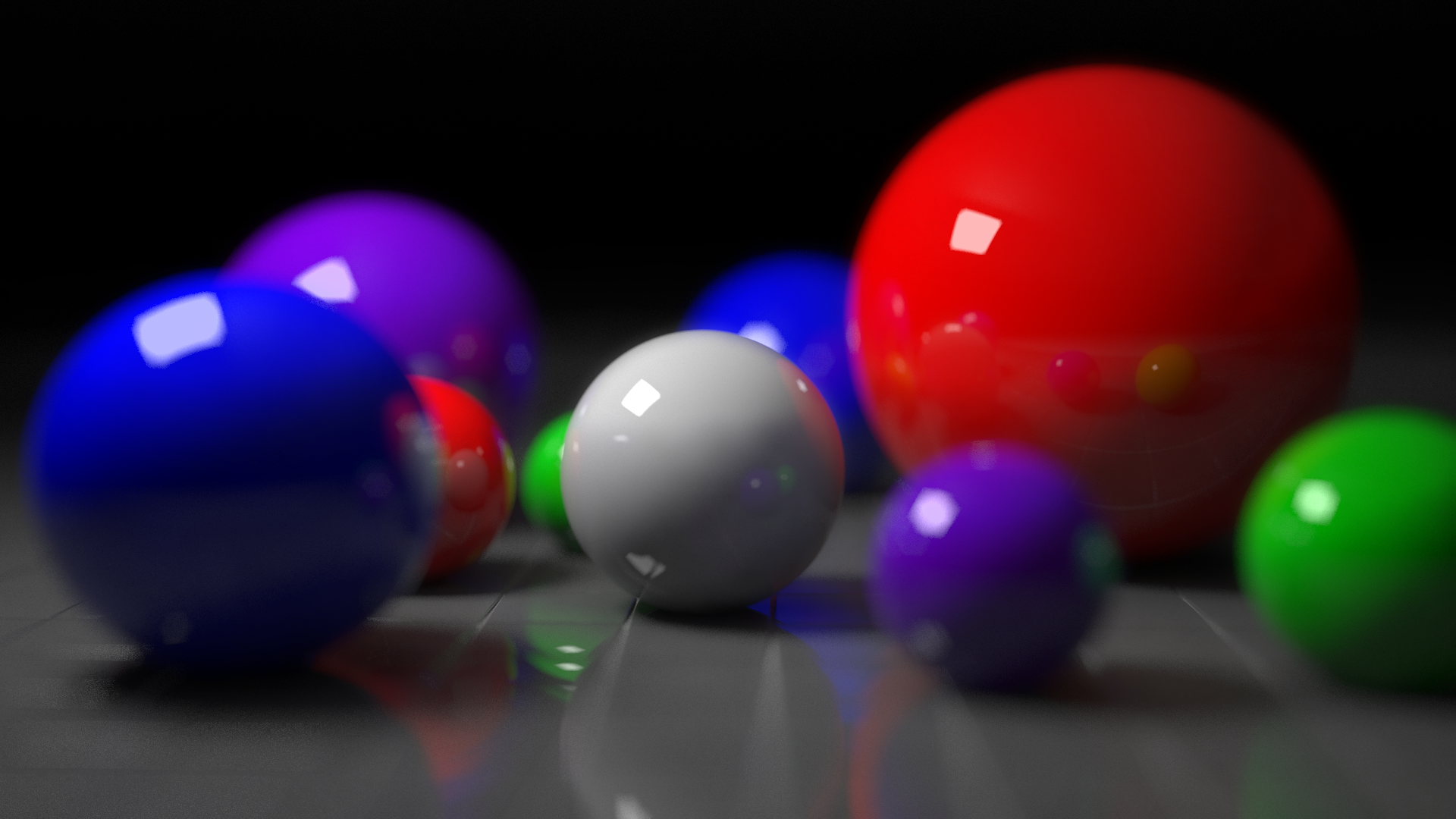
Render created using V-Ray for Rhinoceros 3D, demonstrating the advanced effects V-Ray is capable of, such as reflection, depth of field, and the shape of the aperture (in this case, a hexagon)

V-Ray is a biased computer-generated imagery rendering software application developed by Bulgarian software company Chaos. V-Ray is a commercial plug-in for third-party 3D computer graphics software applications and is used for visualizations and computer graphics in industries such as media, entertainment, film and video game production, industrial design, product design and architecture.

== Overview ==
V-Ray is a rendering engine that uses global illumination algorithms, including path tracing, photon mapping, irradiance maps and directly computed global illumination.

The desktop 3D applications that are supported by V-Ray are:

- Autodesk 3ds Max
- Autodesk Revit
- Cinema 4D
- Autodesk Maya
- Nuke
- Rhinoceros
- SketchUp
- Katana
- Unreal Engine
- Houdini
- Blender

Academic and stand-alone versions of V-Ray are also available.

Modo support was discontinued at the end of 2021.

In 2021, V-Ray received an Engineering Emmy Award from the Television Academy.

== Notable studios using V-Ray ==
=== North America ===
==== United States ====
- Method Studios
- Digital Domain
- Blur Studio
- Zoic Studios
- Apple Inc.
- Hogarth Worldwide

==== Canada ====
- Bardel Entertainment

=== Europe ===
==== France ====
- ZAG Entertainment

==== Netherlands ====
- PostOffice Amsterdam

==== Germany ====
- Scanline VFX

=== Asia ===
==== South Korea ====
- SAMG Entertainment

== See also ==
- List of 3D rendering software
