= Grasshopper 3D =

Programming language

Grasshopper
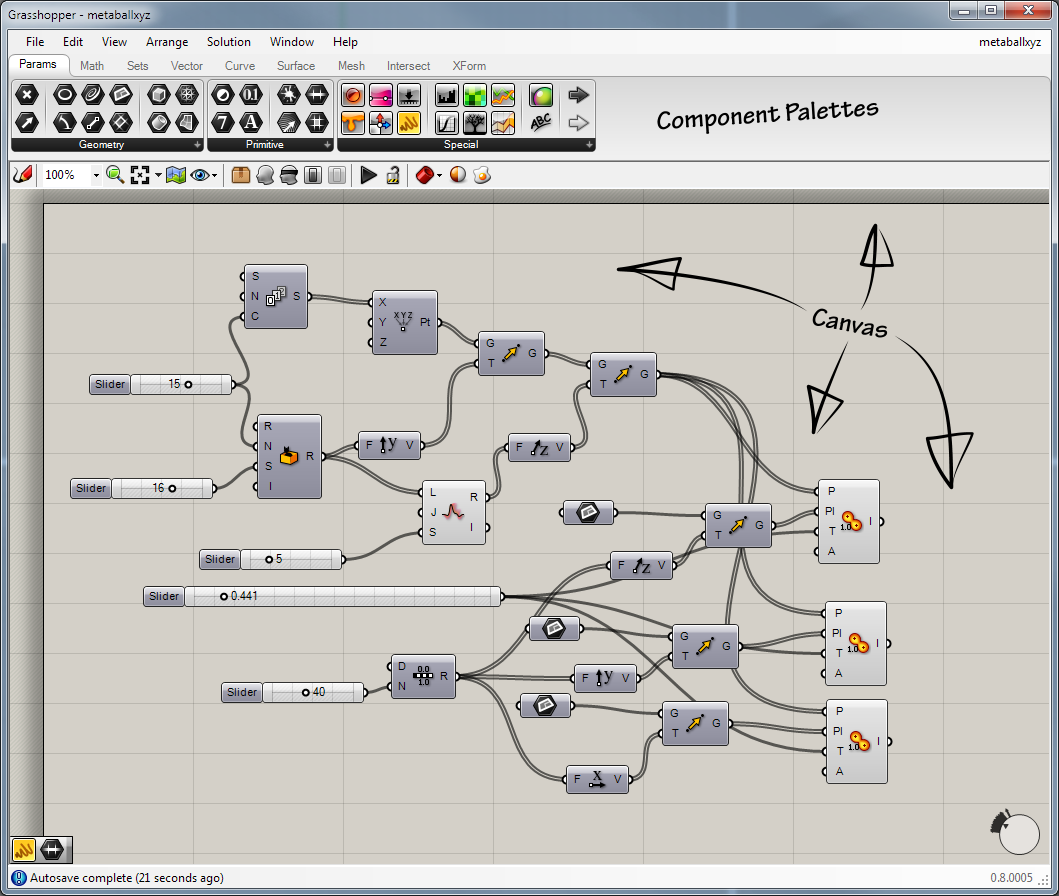
- A sample program in the Grasshopper GUI
- Paradigm: visual programming
- Designed by: David Rutten
- Developer: Robert McNeel & Associates (TLM, Inc.)
- First appeared: September 2007; 19 years ago
- Stable release: Rhinoceros 3D 8.1 / November 21, 2023; 2 years ago
- OS: Windows 2000 and later, macOS
- License: Proprietary
- Filename extensions: .gh (binary), .ghx (ascii), .gha (plugins)
- Website: grasshopper3d.com

Grasshopper is a visual programming language and environment that runs within the Rhinoceros 3D computer-aided design (CAD) application. The program was created by David Rutten, at Robert McNeel & Associates. Programs are created by dragging components onto a canvas. The outputs of those components are then connected to the inputs of subsequent components.

== Overview ==
Grasshopper is primarily used to build generative algorithms, such as for generative art. Many of Grasshopper's components create 3D geometry. Programs may also contain other types of algorithms including numeric, textual, audio-visual and haptic applications.

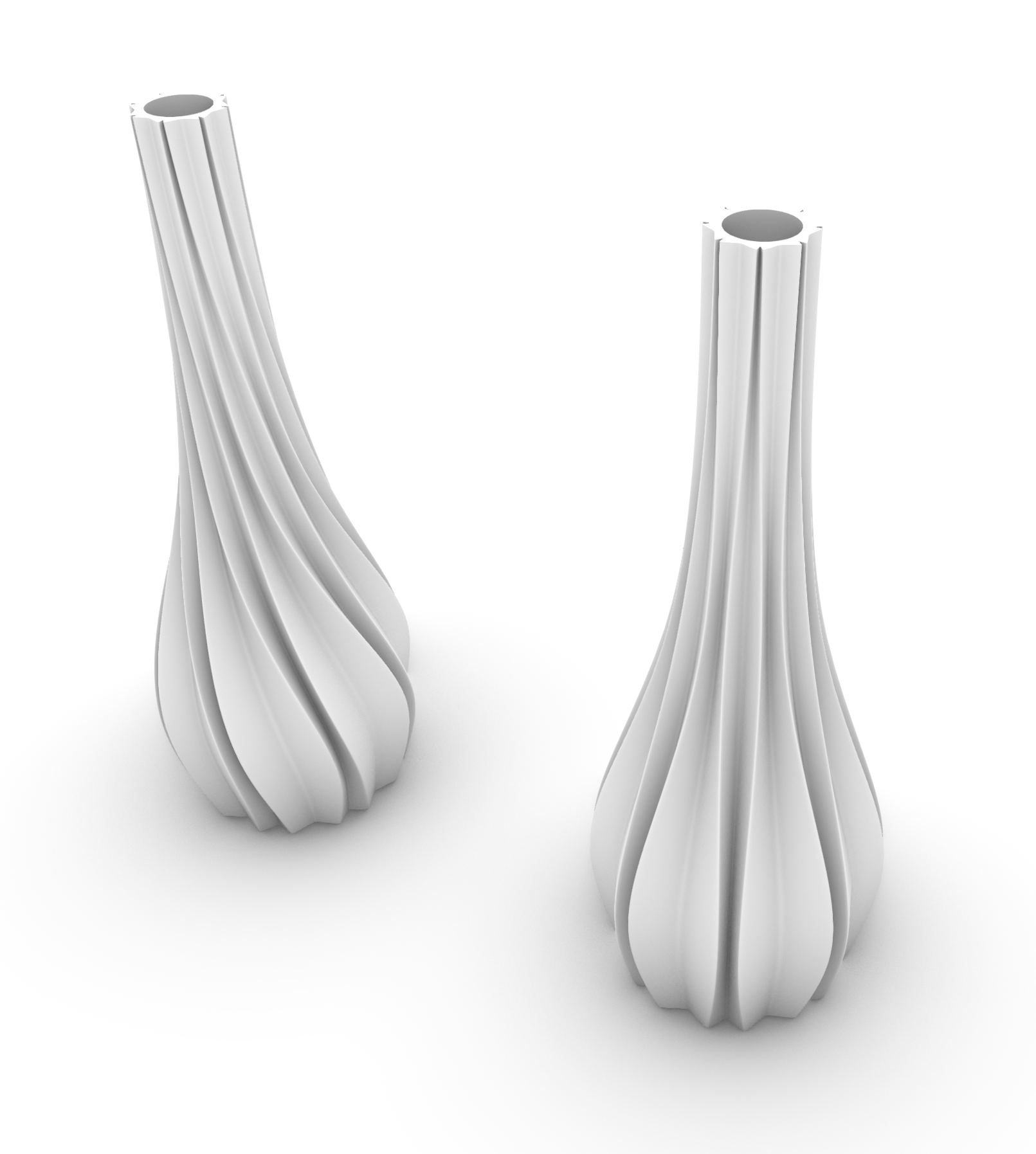
Grasshopper-controlled parametric vase example in Rhino, showing design iteration

Advanced uses of Grasshopper include parametric modelling for structural engineering, architecture and fabrication, lighting performance analysis for energy efficient architecture, and building energy use.

The first version of Grasshopper, then named Explicit History, was released in September 2007. Grasshopper was made part of the standard Rhino toolset in Rhino 6.0, and continues to be.

AEC Magazine stated that Grasshopper is "Popular among students and professionals, McNeel Associate’s Rhino modelling tool is endemic in the architectural design world. The Grasshopper environment provides an intuitive way to explore designs without having to learn to script." Research supporting this claim has come from product design and architecture.

Grasshopper 2 has been in development since at least 2014, when David Rutten mentioned development of it on his blog. It is possible to download a "WIP" / Alpha release version into Rhino 8 via the package manager. It is not clear when GH2 will be included in standard Rhino.

== See also ==
- Architectural engineering
- Comparison of computer-aided design software
- Design computing
- Parametric design
- Generative design
- Responsive computer-aided design
- Visual programming language
