= Rhinoceros 3D =

3D computer graphics software

Rhinoceros
- Developers: Robert McNeel & Associates (TLM, Inc.)
- Stable release: Rhino 8.33 / July 7, 2026; 22 days ago
- Operating system: Windows, macOS
- Available in: Multilingual
- Type: 3D computer graphics, computer-aided design
- License: Proprietary
- Website: rhino3d.com mcneel.com

Rhinoceros (typically abbreviated Rhino or Rhino3D) is a commercial 3D computer graphics and computer-aided design (CAD) application software that was developed by TLM, Inc, dba Robert McNeel & Associates, an American, privately held, and employee-owned company that was founded in 1978. Rhinoceros geometry is based on the non-uniform rational B-spline (NURBS) mathematical model, which focuses on producing mathematically precise representation of curves and freeform surfaces in computer graphics (in contrast to a polygon mesh mathematical model).

Rhinoceros is used for computer-aided design (CAD), computer-aided manufacturing (CAM), rapid prototyping, 3D printing and reverse engineering in industries including architecture, industrial design (e.g., automotive design, watercraft design), product design (e.g., jewelry design) as well as for multimedia and graphic design.

Rhinoceros is developed for Microsoft Windows and macOS. A visual scripting language add-on for Rhino, Grasshopper, is developed by Robert McNeel & Associates.

== Overview ==
=== Characteristics ===
Rhinoceros is primarily a freeform surface modeler that uses the NURBS mathematical model. Rhinoceros's application architecture and open SDK make it modular and enable a user to customize the interface and create custom commands and menus.

Since version 7, Rhinoceros has improved real-time rendering abilities for improved lighting and shading.

== File formats ==
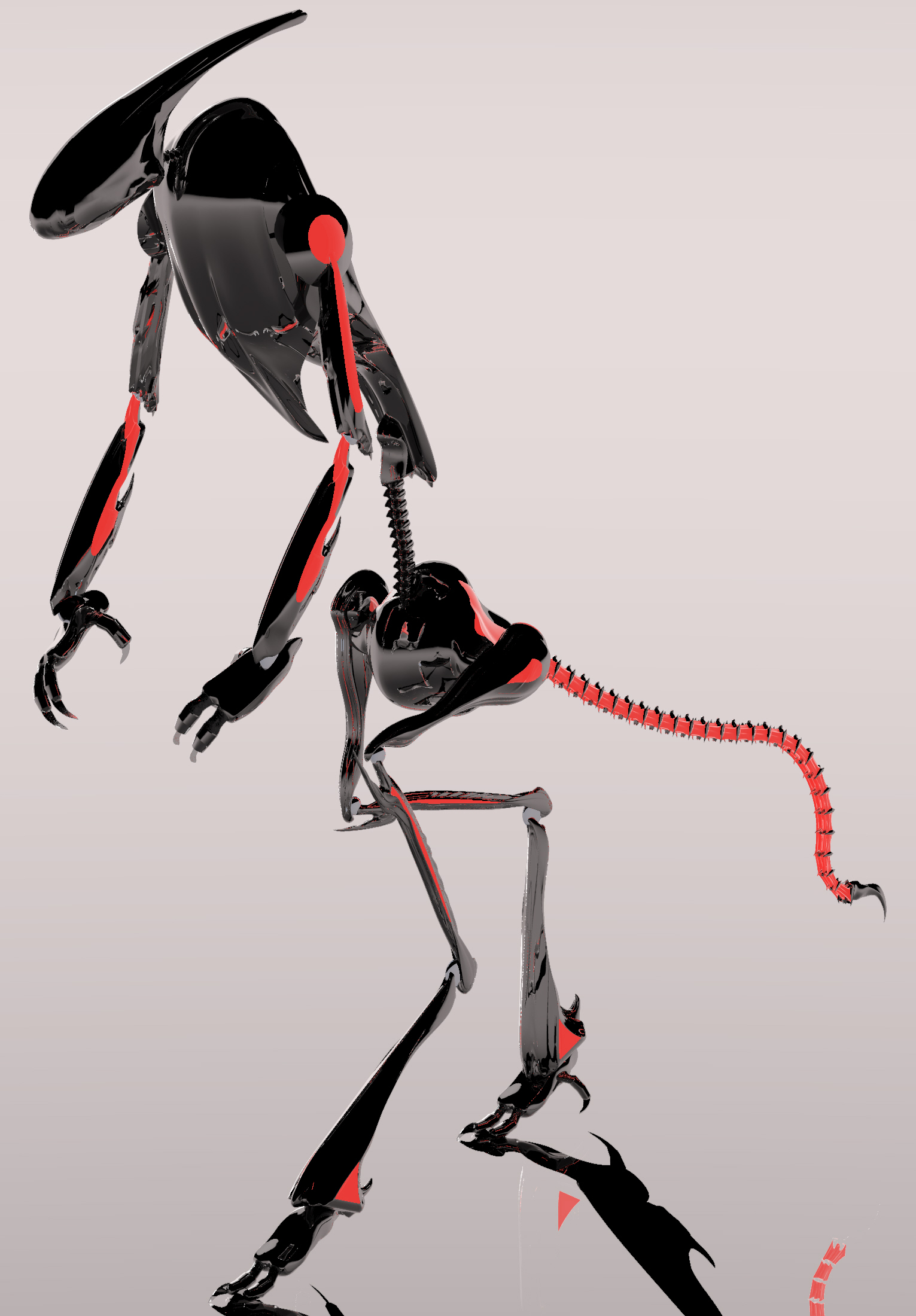
An example of artwork modeled in Rhino and rendered in Flamingo

The Rhinoceros file format (.3DM) is useful for the exchange of NURBS geometry. The Rhino developers started the openNURBS Initiative to provide computer graphics software developers the tools to accurately transfer 3-D geometry between applications. An open-source toolkit, openNURBS includes the 3DM file format specification, documentation, C++ source code libraries and .NET 2.0 assemblies to read and write the file format on supported platforms – Windows, Windows x64, Mac, and Linux.

=== Compatibility ===
Rhinoceros offers compatibility with other software as it supports over 30 CAD file formats for importing and exporting.

The following CAD or image files are natively supported (without the use of external plug-ins):

Legend
Windows only

File type	File extension	Open/import	Save/export
Rhino 3D model	.3dm	X	X
Rhino 3D model backup	.3dmbak	X	X
Rhino worksession	.rws	X	X
3MF	.3mf	X	X
3D Studio	.3ds	X	X
AMF	.amf	X	X
ACIS	.sat		X
Adobe Illustrator	.ai	X	X
Autodesk DWG	.dwg	X	X
AutoCAD DXF	.dxf	X	X
COLLADA	.dae		X
Adobe Cult3D	.cd		X
DirectX	.x	X	X
E57	.e57	X	
Embroidery	.dst, .exp	X	
Enhanced Metafile	.emf, .wemf		X
Encapsulated PostScript	.dst, .exp	X	
Geomview OFF	.off	X	
GHS Geometry	.gf, .gft	X	X
glTF	.gltf, .glb	X	X
GHS Part Maker	.pm		X
Google Earth	.kmz		X
GTS (GNU triangulated surface)	.gts	X	X
IGES	.igs, .iges	X	X
Lightwave	.lwo	X	X
MicroStation	.dgn	X	
Moray UDO	.udo		X
MotionBuilder	.fbx	X	X
NextEngine scan	.scn	X	
OBJ (Wavefront)	.obj	X	X
Object properties	.csv		X
Parasolid	.x_t		X
PDF	.pdf	X	X
PLY	.ply	X	X
Points file	.asc, .csv, .xyz, .pts	X	
Points file	.cgo_ascii, .cgo_asci	X	
Points file	.txt	X	X
POV-Ray	.pov		X
Raw triangles	.raw	X	X
Recon M	.m, .pts	X	
RenderMan	.rib		X
SVG	.svg	X	X
SketchUp	.skp	X	X
Slice	.slc	X	X
SolidWorks	.sldprt, .sldasm	X	
STEP	.stp, .step	X	X
STL	.stl	X	X
Universal Scene Description	.usd, .usdz		X
VDA	.vda	X	X
VRML / Open Inventor	.wrl, .vrml, .iv	X	X
WAMIT	.gdf	X	X
Windows Metafile	.wmf		X
X3D	.x3dv		X
XAML	.xaml		X
XGL	.xgl		X
Zcorp (3D Systems)	.zpr	X	X

The following CAD file formats are supported with use of external plug-ins:

- 3DPDF
- ACIS
- CATIA v4, v5, v6
- CGR
- Inventor
- JT
- Parasolid - import
- PLMXML
- Creo Parametric
- Solid Edge
- Siemens NX

When opening CAD file formats not in its native .3dm file format, Rhinoceros will convert the geometry into its native format; when importing a CAD file, the geometry is added to the current file.

When Autodesk AutoCAD's file format changes (see DWG file format for more information), the Open Design Alliance reverse engineers the file format to allow these files to be loaded by other vendors' software. Rhinoceros's import and export modules are actually plug-ins, so they can be easily updated via a service release. Rhinoceros service releases (SR) are frequent and freely downloadable. Rhinoceros 5 SR10 can import and export DWG/DXF file formats up to version 2014.

=== Scripting and programming ===
Rhinoceros supports two scripting languages, Rhinoscript (based on VBScript) and Python (v5.0+ and Mac). It also has an SDK and a complete plug-in system.

== Plugins ==
Food4Rhino is the main hosting platform for plugins and add-ons for Rhinoceros 3D.

=== Orca3D ===
Orca3D is a plug-in for Rhinoceros 3D used in naval architecture. It adds tools for hull, deck, and superstructure modeling. It tests and tracks hydrostatics, stability analysis, computational fluid dynamics, weight and center of gravity. Orca3D is commonly used for designing yachts and commercial vessels and integrates directly with Rhino's modeling environment.

=== Grasshopper 3D ===
Grasshopper 3D is a node-based procedural modeling plugin that runs within Rhinoceros 3D, allowing users to create parametric models.

=== VisualARQ ===
VisualARQ is a Building Information Modeling (BIM) plugin that adds parametric architectural objects, dynamic documentation tools, Grasshopper 3D integration, and IFC import/export for enhanced interoperability with other BIM platforms.

=== Jewelry plugins ===
Matrixgold, Panther 3D, Crayoo are plugins to help in jewellery design for Rhinoceros 3D.

== Rendering ==
Rhino Render is a built in rendering engine that does real-time rendering in Rhinoceros 3D.

=== Third-party rendering plugins ===
- Enscape
- Octane Render
- Maxwell Render
- V-Ray
- Thea Render
- Keyshot
- Maverick Render
- D5 Render
- Fluidray
- Iray

== Linux Compatibility ==
There has been an ongoing urge for a Linux version of Rhino. With update 11.14 to Wine (software), a straightforward installation and usage on Linux systems has been made possible.

== See also ==
- Comparison of computer-aided design software
- Computer-aided industrial design
- List of BIM software
- List of 3D modeling software
