= SketchUp =

Architectural 3D modelling CAD software

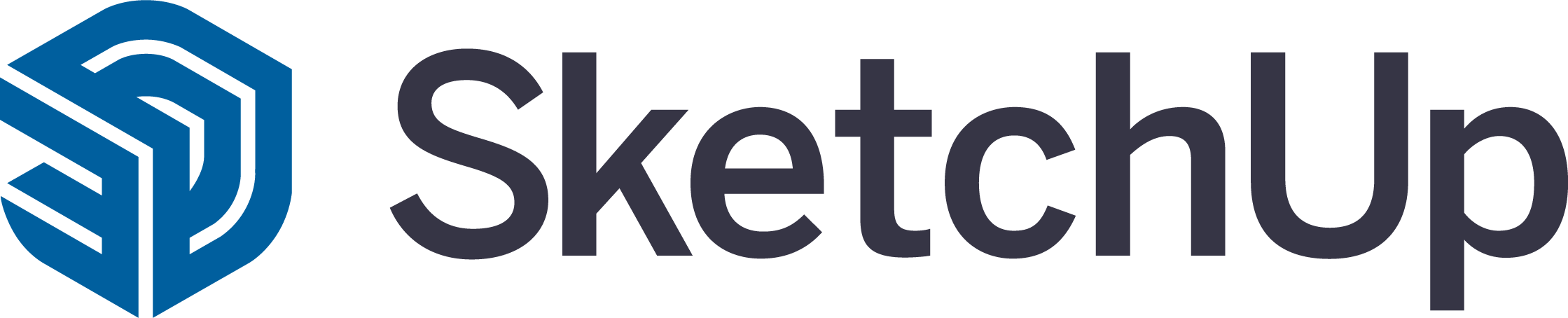
- Original authors: @Last Software, Google
- Developer: Trimble Inc.
- Release: August 2000; 26 years ago

Stable release(s)
- Windows, 64-bit: 2026.0
- macOS: 2026.0
October 7, 2025; 12 months ago
- Operating system: macOS, Windows
- Available in: English, French, Italian, German, Spanish, Korean, Japanese, Brazilian Portuguese Russian, Chinese (Simplified and Traditional)
- Type: 3D computer graphics
- License: Proprietary; Subscription
- Website: www.sketchup.com

SketchUp is a proprietary 3D modeling and computer-aided design software for creating and manipulating 3D models, aimed at architecture, interior design, set design, product design, and manufacturing.

SketchUp was founded by @Last Software in 1999, before the company was acquired by Google in 2006. Google subsequently sold Sketchup to Trimble Inc. in 2012. The software has a free web-based version and three paid subscriptions to gain access to applications for Windows and macOS.

== History ==
=== @Last Software ===
SketchUp was developed by startup company @Last Software of Boulder, Colorado, which was co-founded in 1999 by Brad Schell and Joe Esch. SketchUp was created in August 1999 as a 3D content creation tool and was envisioned as a software program for design professionals. The program won a Community Choice Award at its first trade show in 2000. The first macOS release of SketchUp won a "Best of Show" at Macworld in 2002.

=== Google ===
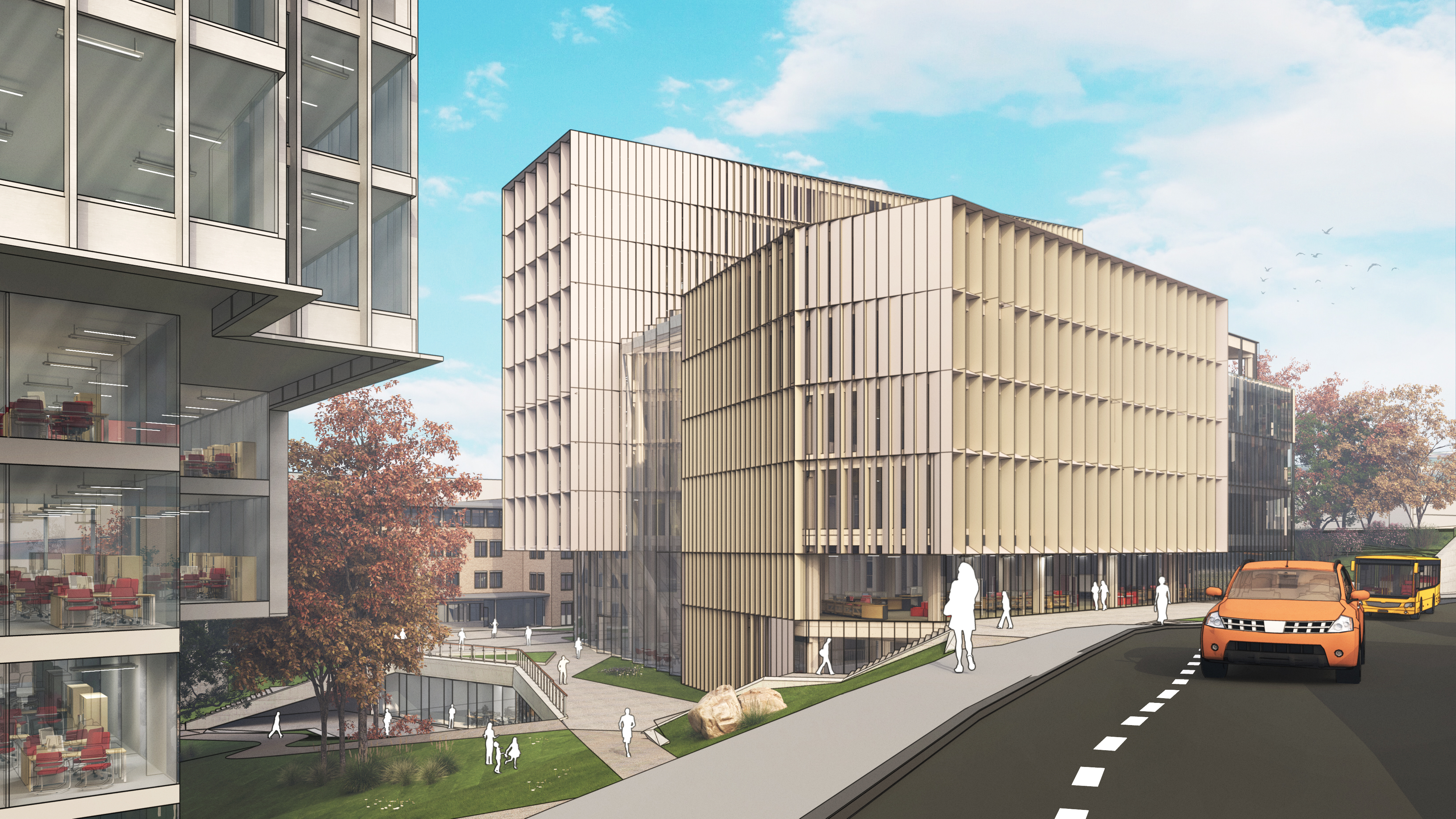
Lund + Slaatto project designed in SketchUp

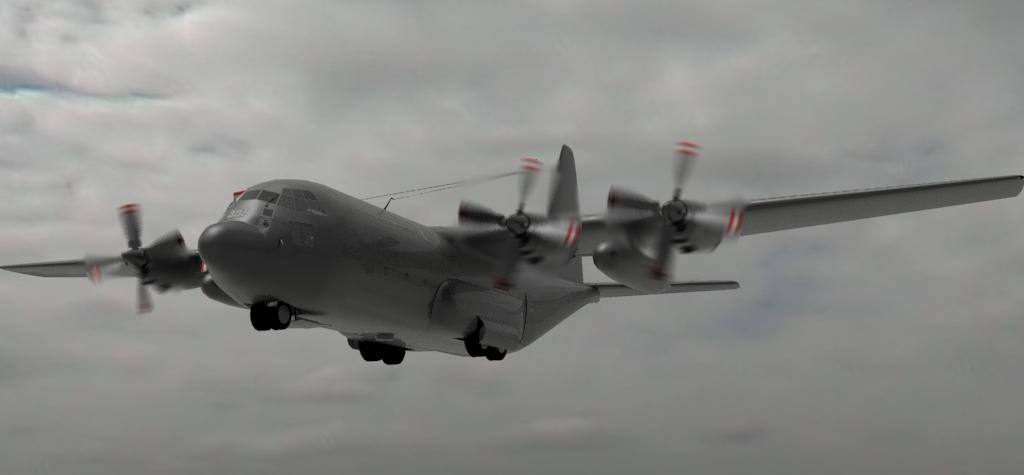
Many different 3D and 2D exporters are available in SketchUp for uses such as rendering. This C-130 Hercules model was made in SketchUp and rendered with Kerkythea.

Google acquired @Last Software on March 14, 2006, attracted by @Last Software's work developing a plugin for Google Earth. On January 9, 2007, Google announced Google SketchUp 6, a free downloadable version of SketchUp, including integrated tools for uploading content to Google Earth and to the Google 3D Warehouse.

Google SketchUp Pro 6 introduced a beta version of Google SketchUp Layout which includes 2D vector tools and page layout tools allowing presentations to be produced without the need for a separate presentation program.

On November 17, 2008, SketchUp 7 was released with integration of SketchUp's Component Browser with Google 3D Warehouse, Lay Out 2, and dynamic components that respond to scaling.

On September 1, 2010, SketchUp 8 was released with model geolocation with Google Maps and Building Maker integration. Geolocation information is always stored in the .KMZ file. The building designs themselves are saved in SKP.

=== Trimble ===
Trimble Navigation (now Trimble Inc.) acquired SketchUp from Google on June 1, 2012, for an undisclosed sum. In 2013, SketchUp 2013 was released. A new site was provided.

== Subscriptions ==
SketchUp comes in the following subscription options:

=== Pro ===
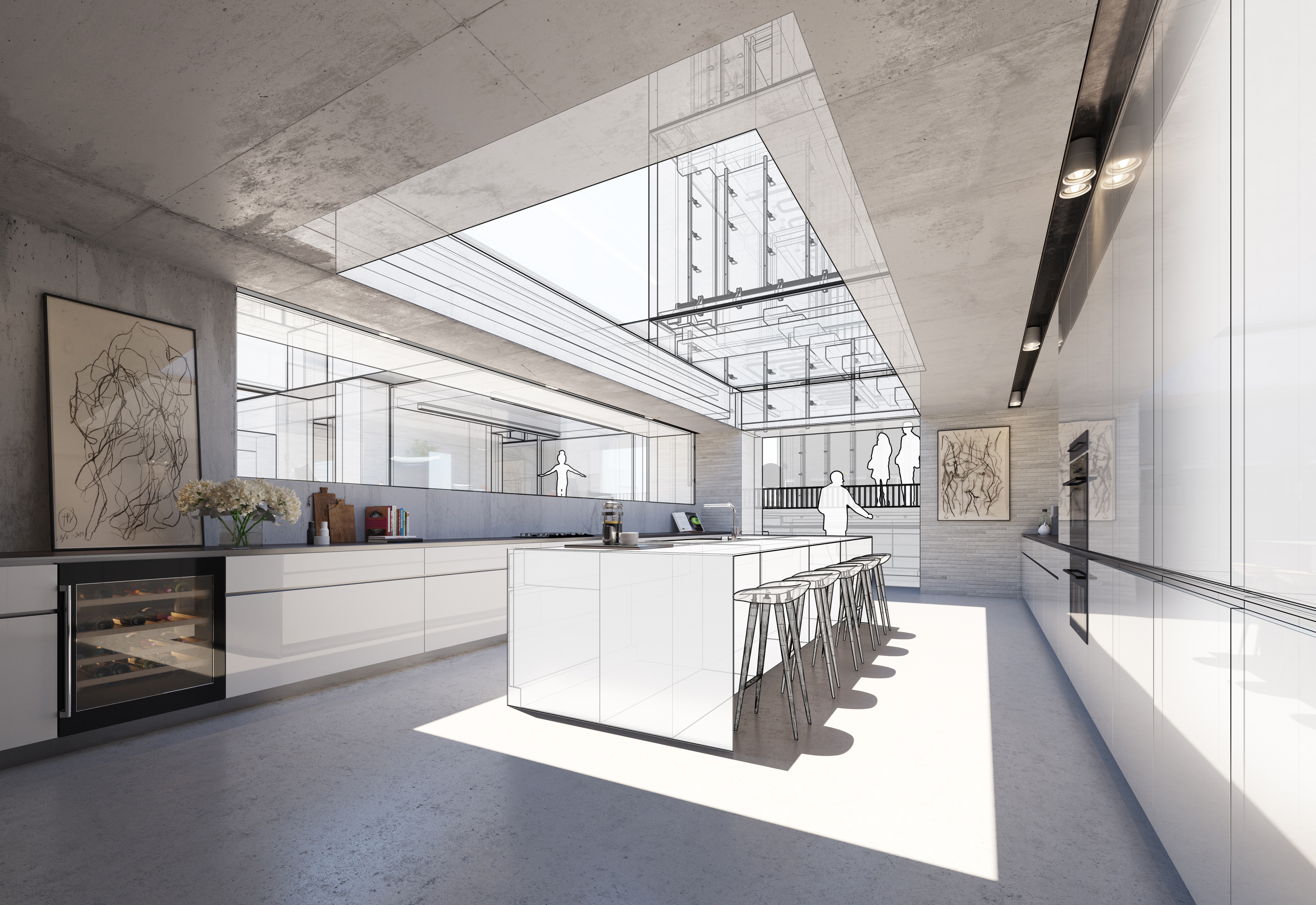
Interior designed in SketchUp.

SketchUp Pro subscription includes the eponymous desktop 3D modeler, plus importers and exporters to common 2D and 3D formats, access to SketchUp's repository of pre-built 3D models (3D Warehouse), access to its extension library (Extension Warehouse), access to Layout (2D documentation software) and Style Builder (create custom edge styles for SketchUp models). SketchUp Pro 2016 has native integration with Trimble Connect, treat 3D Warehouse models as references, a rebuilt Generate Report and now Layout offers web-friendly reference objects as well as a new Layout API.

SketchUp Pro licensing is dual-platform and works on Windows and Mac machines.

=== Studio ===
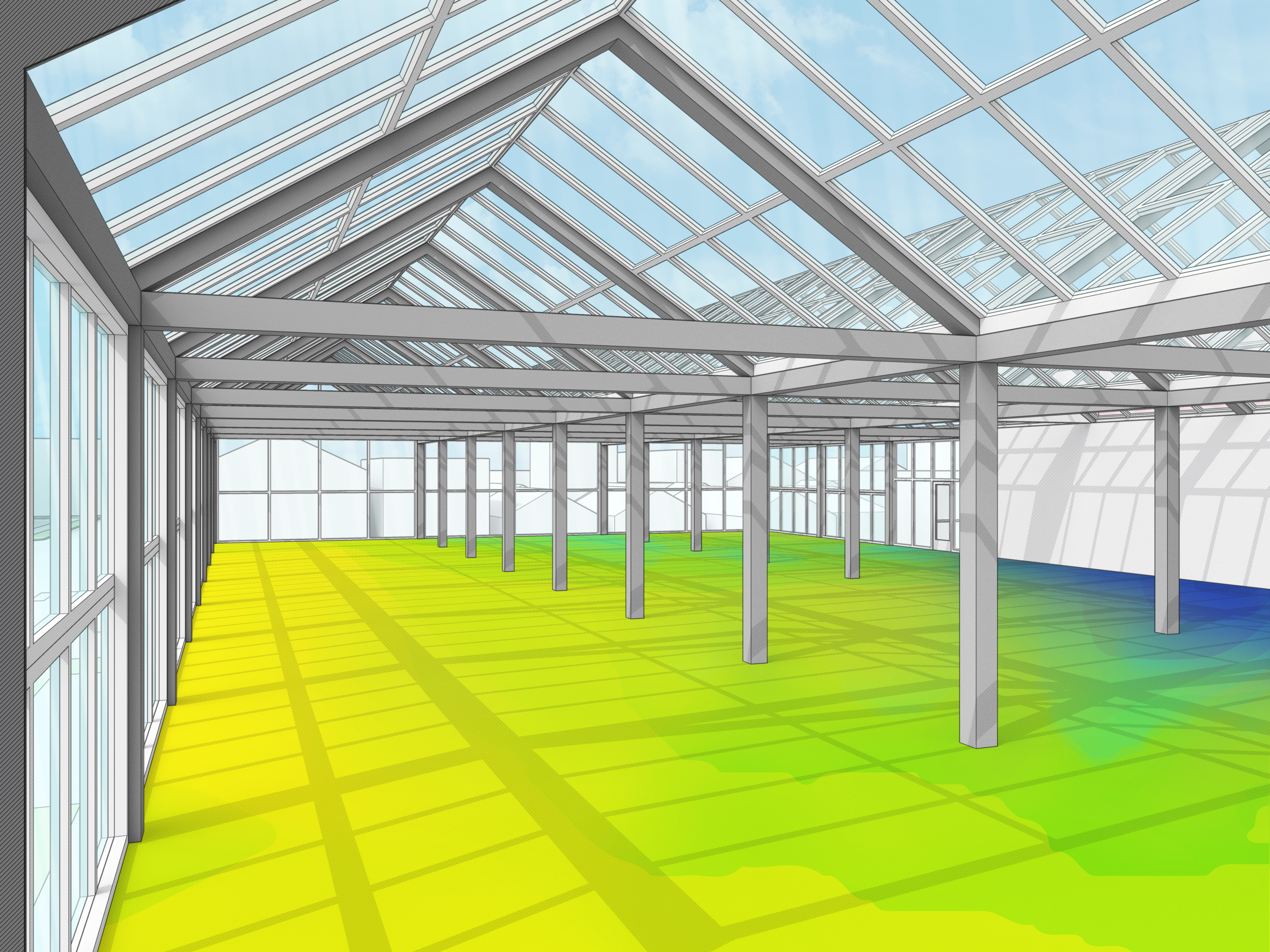
Daylight visualization using SketchUp's daylight analysis tool.

Studio contains everything included in the Pro subscription and management.

Studio also has Advanced tools for importing Revit files and point clouds and generating photoreal renders.

Studio is only available for Windows.

=== Go ===
Go, formerly known as Shop, is a SketchUp offering that includes the following: web and mobile modelers, SketchUp for Web and SketchUp for iPad; Trimble Connect Business, a cloud collaboration tool; and access to SketchUp's model library, 3D Warehouse.

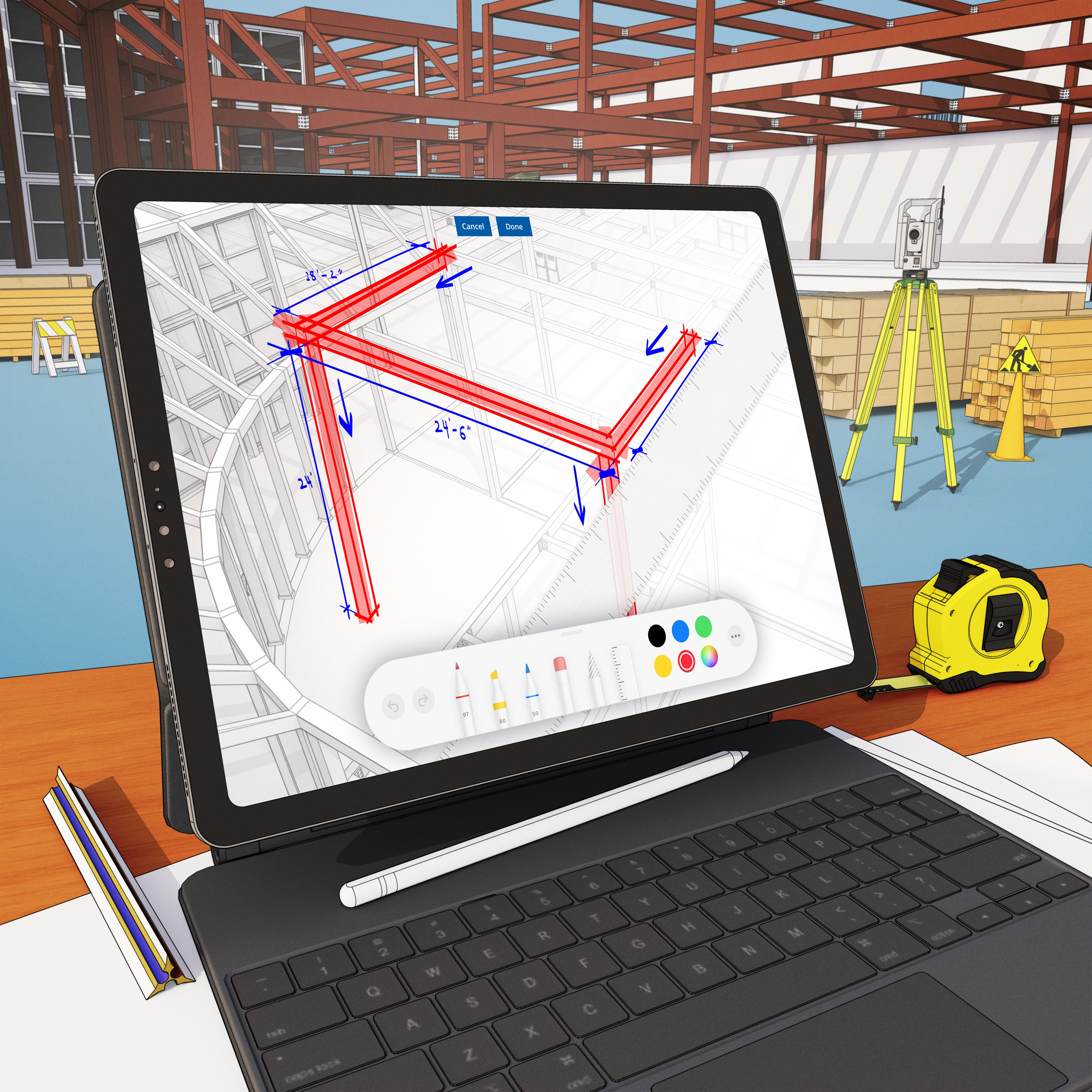
SketchUp's iPad modeler on site.

SketchUp Go does not include the desktop modeler, a downloadable application that can be used offline. Currently, only Pro and Studio plans feature this modeler. SketchUp Go does not support extensions.

=== Free ===
In November 2017, SketchUp Free was released as a web-based application which replaces SketchUp Make. Drawings can be saved to the cloud, saved locally as a native SKP file, or exported as an STL file. Compared to Make, SketchUp Free does not support extensions, creation, and editing of materials. The product is not for commercial use.

== License ==
On June 4, 2020, Trimble announced that SketchUp would transition to a subscription business model. Since November 4, 2020, SketchUp no longer sells perpetual licenses and maintenance & support plans.

== 3D Warehouse ==
3D Warehouse is an open library in which SketchUp users may upload and download 3D models to share. The models can be downloaded right into the program. File sizes of the models can be up to 50 MB. Since 2014 Trimble has launched a new version of 3D Warehouse where companies may have an official page with their own 3D catalog of products.

== Patents ==
SketchUp holds U.S. Patent 6,628,279, granted in September 2003, expired in 2021, on its "Push/Pull" technology.

== Software extensions ==
SketchUp 4 and later support software extensions written in the Ruby programming language, which add specialized functionality. Many such extensions are available to others on the Trimble Extension Warehouse and many other 3rd party websites as well. SketchUp has a Ruby console, an environment which allows experimentation with Ruby.

Some extension plugins for Sketchup are Enscape, Modelur, Sefaira, OpenStudio, V-Ray, Lumion.

SketchUp Free, the web-based version, does not support extensions, which limits the functionality of the tool.

== File formats ==
SketchUp
- Filename extension: .SKP
- Developed by: Trimble Inc.
- Type of format: Binary

SketchUp supports its own .skp file extension.

It supports the following 3D modeling formats: .3DS, .DAE, .DEM, .DDF, .DXF, .DWG, .glTF,.IFC (.IFCZIP), .KMZ, .STL, .PDF.

=== 3D exports ===
SKP, 3DS, DAE, DWG, DXF, FBX, IFC, OBJ, KMZ, STL, WRL, XSI

=== Image exports ===
JPG, PNG, TIF, PDF, EPS

=== Layout formats ===
Layout Import: SKP, BMP, GIF, JPEG, JPG, PNG, TIF, TIFF, RTF, TXT, DWG, DXF, CSV, TSV, XLSX.

Layout Export: PNG, JPG, PDF, DWG, DXF.

== See also ==
- V-Ray - 3D rendering software for SketchUp
- List of BIM software
- List of 3D modeling software
