= List of BIM software =

The following table provides an overview of notable building information modeling (BIM) software.

Building information modeling (BIM) software
Software	Developer	Operating system(s)	License
Archicad	Graphisoft	Windows, macOS	Proprietary
AutoCAD Architecture	Autodesk	Windows	Proprietary
Autodesk BIM 360	Autodesk	Web-based	Proprietary
Autodesk Civil 3D	Autodesk	Windows	Proprietary
Autodesk Revit	Autodesk	Windows	Proprietary
Bonsai (Blender BIM)	Open-source	Windows, macOS, Linux	GNU GPL
BricsCAD	Bricsys nv	Windows, Linux, macOS	Proprietary
CATIA	Dassault Systèmes	Windows, Unix (server)	Proprietary
Cadwork	Cadwork informatik AG	Windows	Proprietary
Cadwork Engineer	Cadwork informatik AG	Windows	Proprietary
Chief Architect	Chief Architect, Inc.	Windows	Proprietary
CodeBook	CodeBook International	Windows	Proprietary
DataCAD	Microtecture Inc., Cadkey Inc., DATACAD LLC	Windows	Proprietary
Digital Project	Gehry Technologies	Windows	Proprietary
FINE MEP	4M	Windows	Proprietary
FreeCAD; BIM Workbench	Open-source	Linux, macOS, Windows	GPL-2.0-or-later
Graphisoft BIM Server	Graphisoft	Windows, macOS	Proprietary
Graphisoft BIMx	Graphisoft	Windows, macOS, iOS, Android	Proprietary
Graphisoft MEP Modeler	Graphisoft	Windows, macOS	Proprietary
IntelliCAD	IntelliCAD Technology Consortium	Windows	Proprietary
MPDS4	CAD Schroer	Windows and Solaris	Proprietary
MicroStation	Bentley Systems	Windows	Proprietary
Autodesk Navisworks	Autodesk	Windows	Proprietary
OpenStudio	National Renewable Energy Laboratory (NREL)	Windows, macOS, Linux	BSD
Prokon	Prokon Software Consultant	Windows	Proprietary
Quantapoint	Quantapoint, Inc.	Windows	Proprietary
Reflex	Reflex Systems Ltd.	Windows	Proprietary
Revizto	Revizto SA	Windows, macOS, iOS and Android	Proprietary
RFEM	Dlubal Software	Windows	Proprietary
RIB Software	Schneider Electric	Windows	Proprietary
Rhinoceros 3D - Grasshopper 3D	McNeel & Associates	Windows, macOS	Proprietary
STAAD	Bentley Systems	Windows	Proprietary
Sefaira	acquired by Trimble Inc.	Windows and MacOS	Proprietary
Tekla Structures	Trimble	Windows	Proprietary
Sketchup	Trimble	Windows, macOS, iPadOS	Proprietary
Vectorworks	Nemetschek Group	Windows, macOS	Proprietary
VisualARQ	Asuni CAD	Windows	Proprietary

== See also ==
- Algorithms-Aided Design
- Arcadia (engineering)
- BuildingSMART
- Computer-aided architectural design
- Comparison of computer-aided design software
- Construction software
- Green building
- List of civil engineering software
- List of 3D modeling software
- List of 3D computer graphics software
- List of computer-aided engineering software
- List of computer-aided manufacturing software
- List of lighting design software
- List of structural engineering software
- Open-source 3D file formats
- Open-source architecture
- Modelur - SketchUp plugin to design built environments
- Navisworks
- Open Design Alliance
- Procore
- Xeokit - open-source JavaScript software development kit (SDK) for rendering 3D graphics in web browsers for BIM
