= Digital Project =

Computer-aided design software application

- Developer: Gehry Technologies
- Stable release: V1, R5 / January 2013
- Operating system: Windows
- Type: Architectural computer-aided design
- License: Proprietary
- Website: digitalproject3d.com

A series of images of buildings designed using Digital Project CAD/CAM software.

Digital Project is a computer-aided design (CAD) software application based on CATIA V5 and developed by Gehry Technologies, a technology company owned by the architect Frank Gehry. Among the changes made by Gehry Technologies to CATIA is a new visual interface suitable for architecture work. With the release of version R5 Digital Project is compatible with CATIA V5R22.

Digital Project is widely known as the software used to design the Guggenheim Museum Bilbao, and the Louis Vuitton Foundation.

Digital Project (like CATIA) enables information to be sent directly to manufacturer, rather than needing to be processed separately in preparation for sending out of house.

On their website Gehry Technology list the following functionality in their DigitalProject:Designer product: generative surfaces design, project organization, parametric 3D surfaces, free-style surface modeling (NURBS), design to fabrication, dynamic sectioning, revision tracking and part comparison, advanced solids modeling and integration with Microsoft Project

Digital Project competes as Building information modeling software with products like ArchiCAD and Revit. It has been used on projects such as Sagrada Familia, Guggenheim Museum Bilbao, Ray and Maria Stata Center, Walt Disney Concert Hall and Hejmdal, The Danish Cancer Societies House.

In 2014, Trimble acquired Gehry Technology, the developers of Digital Project.

== See also ==
- Comparison of computer-aided design editors
