= RUCAPS =

Computer aided design system

RUCAPS (Really Universal Computer-Aided Production System) is a computer-aided design (CAD) system for architects, first developed during the 1970s and 1980s, and today credited as a forerunner of building information modeling (BIM). It runs on minicomputers from Prime Computer and Digital Equipment Corporation (DEC).

== Development ==
The system was initially developed by two graduates of Liverpool University, Dr John Davison and John Watts in the early 1970s. They took their work to architects Gollins Melvin Ward (GMW Architects) in London in the late 1970s, and developed it whilst working on a project for Riyadh University. It became the Really Universal Computer Aided Production System (RUCAPS), and from 1977 was sold through GMW Computers Ltd in several countries worldwide. The term 'building model' (in the sense of BIM as used today) was first used in papers in the mid-1980s: in a 1985 paper by Simon Ruffle, and later in a 1986 paper by Robert Aish - then at GMW Computers - referring to the software's use at London's Heathrow Airport.

RUCAPS was a significant milestone in the development of building modellers, selling many hundreds of copies during the early 1980s when CAD was rare and expensive, and introducing thousands of architects to computer aided design. It is regarded as a forerunner to today's BIM software, and is seen by some writers, e.g.: Jerry Laiserin, as the inspiration behind Autodesk's Revit:

While Autodesk Revit may not contain genomic snippets of Reflex code, Revit clearly is spiritual heir to a lineage of BIM "begats" – RUCAPS begat Sonata, Sonata begat Reflex, and Reflex begat Revit.

RUCAPS was superseded in the mid-late 1980s by Sonata, developed by former GMW employee Jonathan Ingram. This was sold to T2 Solutions (renamed from GMW Computers in 1987), which was eventually bought by Alias|Wavefront but then "disappeared in a mysterious, corporate black hole, somewhere in eastern Canada in 1992." Ingram then went on to develop Reflex, bought out by Parametric Technology Corporation (PTC) in 1996.

=== Comparison with BIM ===
In 1984, RUCAPS was described as a 2½ dimensional interactive system, closer to the philosophy of 2D interactive systems such as ARK/2 or DAISY, and concentrating on the rapid production of 2D drawings (plans, elevations and sections). During the early 1980s, Ingram worked on a supplementary 3D file structure for RUCAPS, where, by running a separate program and with manual intervention, a flat 3D file could be generated, allowing the production of perspectives and images. RUCAPS did carry the 'weather vane' concept from UK-based Applied Research's Building Design System, BDS. (Note: developed at Cambridge by Paul Richens; not to be confused with Charles Eastman's Building Description System, also BDS)

== The system ==
RUCAPS was a building modelling system. It used the concept, introduced by BDS.
