= VisualARQ =

Architectural BIM software

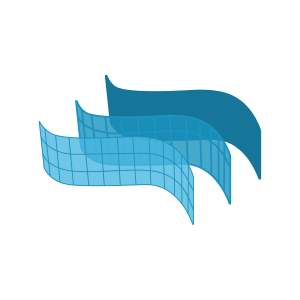
- Developer: Asuni CAD S.A.
- Initial release: October 2009
- Stable release: 3.0 / October 9, 2024
- Operating system: Windows (XP/Vista/7/8/10/11)
- Platform: Rhinoceros (7-8)
- Available in: English, Spanish, French, Italian, German, Czech, Chinese, Korean, Portuguese
- Type: CAD, BIM
- License: Proprietary
- Website: http://www.visualarq.com/

VisualARQ is commercial architectural BIM software that works as a plug-in for Rhinoceros CAD application; developed by Asuni CAD, based in Barcelona, Spain. It is aimed at Rhinoceros users and professionals working in the architecture sector such as architects, interior designers and developers. It competes with Architectural Desktop, Revit and ArchiCAD.

== History ==
It was first implemented as a plug-in for AutoCAD and AutoCAD LT released in 2000, as a competitor to Architectural Desktop, another AEC plug-in for AutoCAD developed by Autodesk.

== Releases ==
Release history
Version	Date of release	New features
VisualARQ 1.0	2009, October 27	
VisualARQ 1.1	2010, November 9	Level manager
VisualARQ 1.2	2011, January 17	Beam object; IFC 2x3 export; Context help
VisualARQ 1.3	2011, March 30	Stair slab; Multi-core Hidden Line Removal engine
VisualARQ 1.4	2011, July 25	Gable/hip roofs; Jog sections; Realtime sections; Glass muntins; Awning/hooper/hung windows
VisualARQ 1.5	2012, February 9	Rhinoceros 5.0 (32 and 64-bit) support; Real-time plan views; New display mode 'Hidden'.
VisualARQ 1.6	2012, July 24	Hatched section views; Real-time plan views in page layout details; Customizable wall joints.; Wall components wrapping.; Tables with length, area and volume of VisualARQ objects.
VisualARQ 1.7	2013, January 21	New railing object.; Multi-threaded regeneration of VisualARQ geometry (Rhino 5 only); Extrusion objects are used instead of breps when possible (Rhino 5 only).; Faster display of VisualARQ objects.; Identical columns and beams share the same instance definition.; Smaller and better IFC output files.; Doors and windows can be created from profile curves directly in the model.; Added volume property to space object.
VisualARQ 1.8	2014, June 5	New parametric Curtain wall object.; Section attributes on VisualARQ and Rhino objects.; New Level Manager to show and hide levels easily.; Texture mappings now works on VisualARQ objects.; New release of VisualARQ Grasshopper Components WIP 3.; Improved IFC exporter.; Full AISC and European standard beam styles added to VisualARQ templates.; New Tag object: displays VisualARQ objects information in 2D labels.; Plan View automatic update.; Help also available in Spanish, German, Italian and French.; Zoo support: shares VisualARQ licenses among users on the same network workgroup.
VisualARQ 1.9	2015, May 8	IFC Import.; IFC tag.; Multilayer slabs; Columns can be created from blocks for the 2D/3D representation; Option to insert openings in Curtain walls; Curtain walls with curved panels; Added a control point to lean curtain walls; Tag orientation; Plan view depth of field
VisualARQ 2.0	2017, September 29	Grasshopper styles: option to create dynamic blocks with VisualARQ objects from grasshopper definitions.; New Element, Furniture and Annotation objects; New commands to do Boolean unions and differences between Rhino solids and VisualARQ objects; 2D Vector output for printing the 3D model for a real time 2D drawings; Custom parameters to add information to Rhino and VisualARQ objects.; Custom parameters are exported as IFC properties.; Quantity takeoffs for Rhino geometry; New Section Manager to create sections and align viewports to sections; New symbols for the Section object arrow, and Tag object shapes; Beam end cuts and joints calculation; Custom profiles with holes; Multilayer Roof styles.; Roof intersection calculations; New toolbar and commands to select VisualARQ objects of the same type; New commands to add and remove elements for space calculations; New Grasshopper components added for creating Texts, Hatches and Blocks; Added new "Conceptual" and "Realistic" display modes
VisualARQ 2.1	2018, April 19	Support on Rhino 6; Help available in Japanese; New vaFlip command; New "IFC Type" and "IFC Tag" components for Grasshopper; New "New Parameter" and "Get Object Properties" components for Grasshopper; Curtain walls are detected as spatial elements when inserting spaces.
VisualARQ 2.2	2018, June 13	New vaSplit and vaFillet command; New "Update Property" component for Grasshopper; Element and Furniture objects created from Grasshopper styles can be rotated in 3D.; Added new toolbars for the Railing, Curtain wall, and Stair objects
VisualARQ 2.3	2019, September 26	Added support for HiDPI displays; New "Section" component for Grasshopper; New components Building and Level to reference buildings and levels.; Added new toolbars for the Railing, Curtain wall, and Stair objects
VisualARQ 2.4	2019, January 30	VisualARQ Script API available; New components to create Section views from Grasshopper
VisualARQ 2.5	2019, July 18	Faster and improved Hidden Line vector drawings; VisualARQ Object Pipeline component in Grasshopper; Added a new component in Grasshopper to create Block definitions.
VisualARQ 2.6	2019, November 4	Extend Curtain walls vertically; Support to render the model in section; Wall height by layer; Wall thickness by object; Beam extension arrow
VisualARQ 2.7	2020, February 13	Plan View component in Grasshopper; Curtain Wall Extend component in Grasshopper; Section attributes for blocks
VisualARQ 2.8	2020, May 13	Floating licenses through Cloud zoo; Overhead attributes; Plan cut elevation to show objects above or below cut plane.; Bottom control arrow to extend walls and curtain walls
VisualARQ 2.9	2020, October 22	Rhino 7 support; Translation to Russian
VisualARQ 2.10	2021, February 11	Wall from SubD; VisualARQ Zoo plug-in for Rhino 7; Added control points for spaces created from curves
VisualARQ 2.11	2021, June 16	Wall layer offsets in Grasshopper; IFC import and export dialogs, with the option to import and export IFC files with no parametric features; Show custom parameters in space labels and tags; Option to view only the sectioned geometry in section views and in plan views.
VisualARQ 2.12	2021, December 22	Section attributes and VisualARQ objects plan representations in worksessions; Override attributes per plan/section view style; Support for Grasshopper Player; Translation to Portuguese; Save changes on VisualARQ display modes
VisualARQ 2.13	2023, April 4	Component to get the start and end cut planes of beams in Grasshopper; Reference VisualARQ objects with the Grasshopper Player; VisualARQ Labs plug-in; Translation to Chinese Traditional; Support to VRay Interactive Render
VisualARQ 3.0	2024, October 9	IFC 4 and 4.3 support; Objects Link to Levels; Dynamic Table Report Panel; Buildings with Boundary; Clashes and Clearances Report; Reflected Ceiling Plans; Guides; Walls and Curtain Walls from Grasshopper Styles; Curtain walls from surfaces; Command to extend columns; Option to insert openings in roofs and slabs; Handle component for doors and windows; Objects Intersections and Interferences; Profile Manager; Manage tag contents by style; Export Layouts to DWG; Custom parameter filters by Type and Layer; Expanded object library in templates; Complete list

== Reviews ==
- Reviewed by Nigel Gough on Australian Association of Architectural Illustrators Inc.

== See also ==
- Comparison of CAD editors for CAE
