= Gábor Bojár =

Hungarian entrepreneur

- Born: March 27, 1949 (age 77); Budapest, Hungary
- Citizenship: Hungarian
- Education: Eötvös Loránd University
- Known for: Founder of Graphisoft

Gábor Bojár (born 27 March 1949) is a Hungarian entrepreneur and founder of Graphisoft, an AEC (architecture, engineering, and construction) CAD company. Graphisoft was acquired by German Nemetschek AG in 2007.

In 1973 he received a degree in physics from Eötvös Loránd University. Bojár started his professional career at the state geophysics institute in the late 1970s. In 1982 he left his job and founded Graphisoft with István Gábor Tari, an assistant professor at BME (Budapest University of Technology and Economics).

== Graphisoft ==
Between 1982 and 2007, Bojár served as founder and president-CEO of Graphisoft. The company was launched in 1982, when Bojár and Tari developed software, assisting the Hungarian ministry of power in solving a major problem with the installation of a soviet nuclear power plant. They used the geophysics institute's computers at night, solved the problem and were awarded $30,000 for their software's 300 engineering maps and drawings.

Subsequently, the company re-wrote their software for Apple Lisa, which didn't succeed economically, but kept the company alive throughout the early 1980s. Bojár had to smuggle four Macintosh's into Hungary and was supported with cash by Steve Jobs, whom Bojár had first met in 1984.

During the 1990s, Graphisoft continued to expand internationally. In 1998 the company has been listed on the Frankfurt Stock Exchange and in 2002 on the Budapest Stock Exchange. The company was eventually acquired by the sector leading German company Nemetschek AG, in 2007

Under Bojár's leadership, Graphisoft developed from a small two-person venture into the worldwide market leader in the field of 3D building modeling software, with more than 300 employees and the firm's earnings growing from $30.000 in 1982 to an estimated $30 million in 2002.

In 2003, Bojár named Dominic Gallello as new CEO, remaining active as chairman of the company, in charge of Graphisoft's overall strategy. Following the acquisition by Nemetschek AG in 2007 Bojar continued to serve as chairman of the company until 2021.

=== Graphisoft Park ===
Graphisoft Park SE is a real-estate enterprise, founded by Bojár.

== Aquincum Institute of Technology ==
Following the sale of Graphisoft in 2007, Bojár founded the Aquincum Institute of Technology (AIT), a school for information technology and entrepreneurship, in the same year. The school's curriculum offers design, entrepreneurship, and foundational courses in computer science. The subjects are combined with advanced applications as well as humanities courses related to Hungary's cultural heritage.

== Additional memberships ==
Bojár served on the board of Gedeon Richter and Masterplast Group.

== Awards and recognitions ==
Bojár has received different national and international awards and prizes. He was named Entrepreneur of the Year by Ernst & Young in 2007 and in 2014, he received the Iván Völgyes Award of AmCham Hungary.

Bojár was awarded in 1998 the Széchenyi Prize and in 2002 the Order of Merit of the Republic of Hungary.
