= TMW =

TMW may refer to:

- Trans Media Watch, a British campaign group that aims to ensure that trans and intersex people are treated with accuracy, dignity and respect by media organisations in the UK
- TMW Systems, a developer of enterprise management software for the surface transportation services industry with offices in the United States and Canada
- Tallinn Music Week, a weeklong city festival held every spring in Tallinn, Estonia
- Tamworth Regional Airport, IATA airport code "TMW"
