= Jonathan Ingram =

Australian inventor, businessman, author (born 1961)

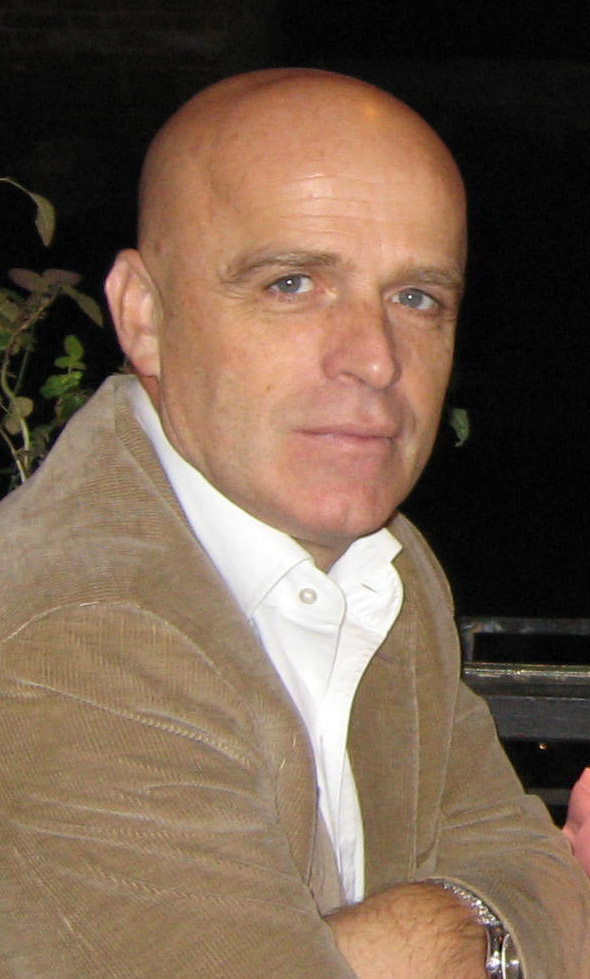
- Ingram in 2021
- Born: 23 June 1961 (age 64); Banaba Island, Kiribati
- Known for: Developments in BIM

Jonathan Ingram (born 23 June 1961) is an Australian inventor, businessman and author. He is particularly associated with development of early building information modelling (BIM) applications, including Sonata, Reflex and ProReflex - described as "the precursor to modern BIM applications". He was awarded the British Computer Society Medal for Outstanding Innovation in 1990, and the Royal Academy of Engineering's Prince Philip Medal in 2016 for his "exceptional contribution to Engineering".

== Career ==
A civil engineer, Ingram has a PhD in computer science.

=== Building information modelling ===
Sometimes called the 'Father of BIM', Ingram worked on developing a precursor of BIM called RUCAPS while working at GMW Computers in the early 1980s. Envisaging a better software, he quit working at GMW, got a bank loan so that he could purchase a workstation, and began two years of development.

Ingram released Sonata in 1985, the first system that brought the characteristics of modern BIM together in a single application, allowing users to create a single model of a building in a single file. Ingram says he came close to an acquisition agreement with Autodesk in 1987 but the deal collapsed following the Black Monday financial crash. He subsequently sold Sonata to GMW which had rebranded to T2 Solutions in 1987.

The second generation software, Reflex was released in 1992. After he sold Reflex for $30m to PTC in 1996, Ingram became Chief Technology Officer at PTC, and taught Harvard University's first courses in object modelling. In 1998, ProReflex was licensed to Charles River Software, later (2000) renamed Revit Systems; two PTC employees had left to develop a BIM application called Revit, working with access to a non-exclusive licence of Reflex, In 2004, Revit cofounder Leonid Raiz confirmed "we indeed had a non-exclusive development license of Pro/Reflex" which Ingram asserts was the origin of some of Revit's features.

AECBytes described Ingram as "someone who actually developed the precursor to modern BIM applications," continuing:

This was an application called SONATA and it was developed by Jonathan Ingram — in true Silicon Valley start-up style — in his attic (rather than a garage as it would be in Silicon Valley!) in England. SONATA became REfLEX, which then became ProReflex, which was acquired by PTC (Parametric Technology Corporation), from which Revit emerged as a start-up, which was then acquired by Autodesk — and then of course, as they say, the rest is history.

Ingram also created one of the earliest examples of a digital twin in 1996 during construction of the Heathrow Express facilities at Heathrow Airport's Terminal 1. With consultant Mott MacDonald, Ingram connected movement sensors in the cofferdam and boreholes to the digital object-model to display movements in the model.

Ingram wrote a book, Understanding BIM: The past, present and future, published by Routledge in 2020. In this book he describes the origins of BIM and its development leading to modern systems such as Revit and Archicad. It shows his work and innovations in BIM in areas including architecture, civil and structural engineering, electrical and mechanical services, construction management and retail. He shows that BIM has been in existence since 1985. Much of the material for his early innovations is archived in the Victoria and Albert Museum in London including the first architectural animation of a real street scene from 1976. AECBytes magazine said of the author

It is fascinating to be able to look back at the origins of BIM from someone who not only had a front-row seat to the game, but who actually played it — and not just played it, but actually drafted many of its rules.

== Awards ==
- The British Computer Society Medal for Outstanding Innovation, 1990.
- The 2016 Prince Philip Medal from the Royal Academy of Engineering for his "Exceptional Contribution to Engineering".

== Personal life ==
Ingram was born in Banaba Island (also called Ocean Island) to Maurice Ingram, a doctor.
