= Sunrise Celebration =

Music festival in the United Kingdom from 2006

Sunrise Celebration is an ethical living, organic arts and music festival that used to take place in Bruton, Somerset, England on an organic farm, and has now moved to Pontrilas, Herefordshire.

== History ==
The even began in 2006 over the summer solstice as an alternative celebration to the Glastonbury Festival. It was originally called the Sunrise Summer Solstice Celebration, but dropped 'summer solstice' from the title in 2007 as the event's date moved to late May to avoid cross-scheduling with Glastonbury. The site in 2006-2008 was Bearley Farm in Bearley, approx. 8 miles (13 km) north of Yeovil. Despite two events in 2006 and 2007, and 6,000-8,000 attendees each year, the company lost £250,000 in this period, and closed as a result.

In 2008 the festival was cancelled due to flash-flooding after a localised storm, although the organisers ran a smaller version of the festival later in the year as part of The Big Chill. As a result of the flooding and financial losses, Sunrise was moved in 2009 to a site near Bruton, on organic farmland, considerably higher above sea level than the previous site. The event shrunk from 12,000 attendees in 2008 to 5,000 in 2009.

Sunrise saw its first financially stable year in 2009 under the management of Natural Communities Community Interest Company. The event grew to 7500 in 2010, and 9000 in 2011. In 2011, the Natural Communities Foundation was set up as the official beneficiary of the festival, in order to achieve more of its charitable aims. That year Sunrise won The Guardian and Observer Newspapers' 'Ethical Travel Award' and The Green Parents 'Best Green Festival Award', and an 'Outstanding' mark with the organisation 'A Greener Festival'.

The 2012 Sunrise Celebration festival returned to its original Summer Solstice dates for the first time since 2006. In 2013, Sunrise Celebration renamed itself 'Sunrise Festivals Another World' and moved sites, this time over the border and into Wiltshire to Thoulstone Park, Chapmanslade. 2014 saw the festival return to its 'family gathering' roots, with the name Sunrise Celebration and much of the original content returning. The new site was a country park at Chepstow, just over the Welsh border, adjoining Chepstow Racecourse.

Since 2019, Sunrise Celebration has not posted any information on their Facebook page, implying they've not hosted a festival gathering since.

== Activities ==
The festival includes five stages and acoustic and performance venues, including a large indoor stage, Chai Wallahs, three dance stages in the Sundance Arena and the Spit and Sawdust stage, hosting a mixture of folk, bluegrass and local up-and-coming bands. Over the years it has hosted stage productions from many of the best outfits in the alternative and underground festival scene. The event includes a mix of alternative culture, with an eclectic musical blend of dub, world music, ska, electronica, dubstep, psytrance, breaks, reggae, folk music and Balkan beats; educational opportunities with Ecobuild, Transition Towns and craft and technology areas.
