= Sefaira =

American software company

Sefaira Ltd.
- Type: Subsidiary
- Industry: Building Design Software
- Founded: 2009
- Founders: Peter Krebs; Mads Jensen
- Headquarters: London, New York
- Key people: Andrew Corney; Peter Krebs; Hugh McEvoy; Hari Natarajan
- Products: Sefaira Architecture; Sefaira Systems
- Number of employees: 50
- Parent: Trimble Inc.
- Website: http://www.sefaira.com/

Sefaira is a software company founded in 2009 that provides green building design software.

On February 8, 2016, Trimble Navigation announced the acquisition of Sefaira Ltd, placing it within the Architecture & Design division.

== History ==
Sefaira was founded in 2009, and incorporated in London, UK, with offices in New York, US, shortly thereafter. The name Sefaira is derived from sefra, the Greek word for sphere, to symbolize the earth as the company's focus.

In 2009, Sefaira won the INSEAD Business Venture Competition, and in 2011 won the "Green Building Innovation of the Year" award at London's Ecobuild.

In April 2012, the company received $10.8 million in Series A funding from Braemar Energy Ventures in partnership with Chrysalix SET Management BV and Hermes GPE.

== Products ==
The company's primary product is Sefaira, a web-based performance analysis platform intended for use during conceptual design by architects, engineers, consultants and building designers. It performs analysis of water, carbon and renewable energy potential.

In July 2012, the Sefaira web application was launched.

In 2013, Sefaira released a plugin for SketchUp.

In 2014, Sefaira released a plugin for Autodesk Revit.

In 2015, Sefaira released Sefaira Systems, adding system sizing and energy analysis functionality for HVAC designers.

In 2020, Trimble released SketchUp Studio 2020, which included access to Sefaira, but this was later reverted to a standalone Sefaira subscription.
