= Graphisoft MEP Modeler =

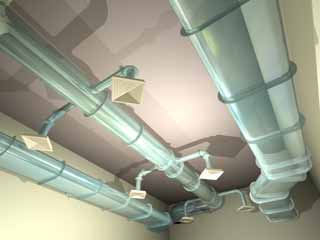
- Developer: Graphisoft
- Initial release: October 2008
- Stable release: 3 / May 1, 2010; 16 years ago
- Operating system: Windows XP, Windows Vista, Windows 7, Mac OS X Leopard, Mac OS X Snow Leopard
- Type: 3D computer graphics, CAD, Building Information Modeling
- License: Proprietary commercial software
- Website: graphisoft.com

Graphisoft MEP Modeler (where MEP stands for Mechanical/Electrical/Plumbing) is an extension to Archicad, Graphisoft's architectural design tool to create three-dimensional models of ductwork, piping and electrical networks in order to make the building information model of the designed building more detailed and accurate.

Since Archicad is primarily used by architects, the building parts which are usually modeled in 3D with Archicad are walls, columns, slabs, roofs, etc. and some other objects like furniture. But when detailed plans are to be elaborated especially if the project is a medium or large-sized building, collision detection and constructibility are becoming more and more important in order to minimize design errors and unnecessary delays during construction. This is where MEP Modeler can help building engineers and architects to create a more detailed building model with ductworks and other HVAC systems modeled in 3D in order to achieve a better coordination between the different trades such as building engineers, structural engineers and architects.

== Features ==
Graphisoft MEP Modeler supports both the creation of MEP models from scratch — based on 2D plans provided by engineers — and the import of 3D data created with other MEP software products such as AutoCAD MEP or Revit MEP. The software provides three basic features:

- MEP Toolbox is a set of dedicated tools (just like the Wall Tool or Window Tool) for modeling and editing ducts, pipes and other system components.
- MEP Library is a library of parametric objects representing different parts of MEP systems with smart connections and other additional parameters needed for building engineering.
- MEP Systems is a feature which helps the organization of various MEP systems beyond a simple grouping feature.
