= CodeBook =

CodeBookTM
- Developer(s): CodeBook International Ltd
- Stable release: 2011 / November 2011
- Operating system: Windows
- Type: CAD Building information modeling
- License: Proprietary
- Website: www.codebookinternational.com

CodeBook is an interoperable CAD overlay Building information modeling (BIM) software suite for Microsoft Windows. The software is currently developed by UK company, Codebook International Ltd.

The software allows the user to design using the conventional design tools (for example: Autodesk Revit, Bentley Microstation, Graphisoft ArchiCAD) and elements, and to create and interrogate a separate BIM database. CodeBook's BIM database contains information gathered during the building's full life cycle, from scoping and concept stages through detailed design and construction to CMMS/FM handover.
