= Cadwork Engineer =

Transportation corridor building information modeling software

Engineer
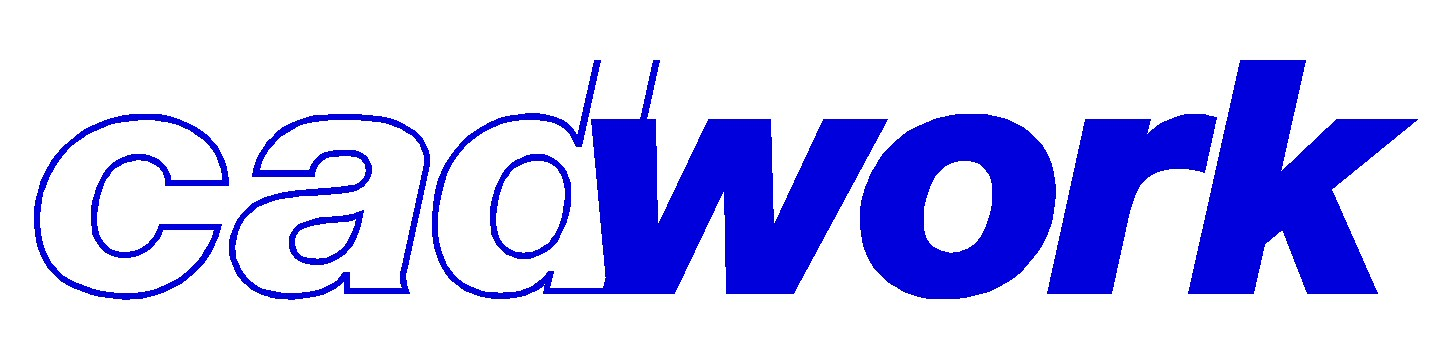
- Developer: Cadwork informatik AG
- Stable release: 30 / 2023
- Operating system: Windows
- Type: BIM
- License: Proprietary
- Website: www.cadwork.ch

Cadwork Engineer is a transportation corridor building information modeling software developed beginning in 2004 by Cadwork informatik AG in Switzerland. When combined with cadwork Lexocad, it is among 'BIM' infrastructure software which crosses from sitework into regional planning.

== Technical characteristics ==
An early adopter is Marti Group, which implemented cadwork Engineer in the BIM configuration on a civil engineering project in the Baselland Canton.

Engineer files are named with the extension .2dr.

Engineer includes modules:

- Roads
- Motorways
- Railways
- Junctions
- Roundabouts
- Point clouds
- Steel reinforcement
- Bridges
- Topography and maps
- Geographic information systems
- Theodolite interface

Engineer provides automatic calculations:

- Clothoid curves
- Three-radius curves for railway
- Horizontal and vertical jointures
- Truck trajectories
- Earth triangulation
- Retaining wall
- Earth Embankments
- Complex profiles with borders, banquettes, and dividers
- Topographic edits

Interfaces:

- Lexoview is guaranteed with Open Inventor format.
- AutoCAD is guaranteed with DWG format.

== See also ==
- Virtual design and construction
- Industry Foundation Classes (IFC)
- Civil engineering
- Construction engineering
- Regional Planning
- Urban Planning
