= Cadwork informatik AG =

Swiss multinational technology and consulting corporation

cadwork informatik AG
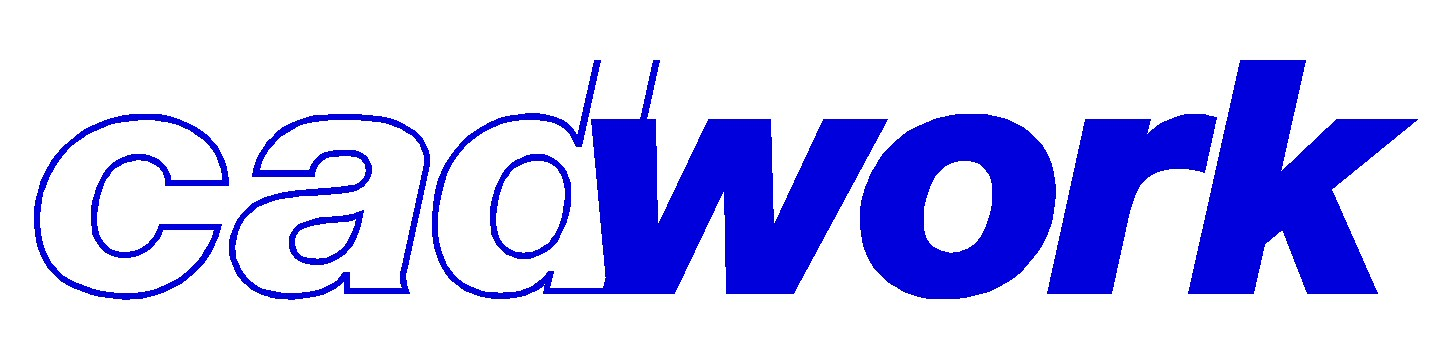
- Industry: Construction, software, and manufacturing & industry
- Founded: 1990; 36 years ago in Basel, Switzerland
- Headquarters: Aeschenvorstadt 21, 4051, Basel, Switzerland
- Number of locations: 20 branch offices (2019)
- Area served: Worldwide
- Key people: Andreas Walther (managing director); Dirk Gnutzmann (Woods director); Jean-Philippe Eschbach; Michel Jecker
- Products: cadwork; cadwork Engineer
- Number of employees: 150 (2019)
- Website: www.cadwork.ch

cadwork informatik CI AG is a multinational software company headquartered in Basel, Switzerland. It develops and markets software products primarily for the construction industry. These products include timber industry products in computer-aided design (CAD) and computer-aided manufacturing (CAM) as well as products in building information model (BIM) and virtual design and construction (VDC). These products are suitable for designers, structural engineers, construction engineers, civil engineering draftspeople, building contractors, and in the case of BIMTeam VDC, the construction crews.

cadwork integration of design, manufacturing, and construction has contributed to Europe's 25-year lead on North America in the timber construction industry. cadwork was formed in 1988 at the École Polytechnique Fédérale de Lausanne (EPFL) Department of Timber Construction as a continuation of research in software by the Swiss Center for Electronics and Microtechnology (CSEM), a watch industry research department. The company has seven subsidiaries with offices in Saône, France; Hildesheim, Germany; Rýmařov, Czech Republic; Breitenwang, Austria; Cuarte, Spain; Montréal, Canada, and Australia.

== Products ==
=== Products and technical details ===
cadwork is mainly known for its timber industry wood products, but in Switzerland, it is a leading software for civil engineers. In 2004, cadwork started the development of Lexocad, a BIM-level design-planning-construction software.

- cadwork 2D: The entry-level module to cadwork 2d, with two-dimensional lines and surfaces with different hatches. It is a '2.5D CAD system', in addition to two-dimensional editing, cadwork 2d also allows for height information. Height information is particularly suitable for construction planning while transitioning from 2D to the 3D module, which in 3d provides for developing a tender for construction project competitions. An alternative to cadwork 2D is AutoCAD. A module of cadwork 2d allows for reinforced concrete and geographic information system (GIS) plans. The file format is .2d.
- cadwork 3D: A timber 3D CAD/CAM design product. In cadwork 3d, one works with volumes to depict walls, generate wooden and steel rakes, and plan three-dimensional nodes space. The primary areas of application are timber and steel construction. cadwork 3D offers free volume models; an internal axis (length, width, and height) makes it possible to assemble the individual components easily into complex, three-dimensional structures. There are several additional modules, such as a wizard for entering a roof, an assistant for the elementation of walls, or also the output of the individual components as a dimensioned 2D component drawing or on computer numerical control (CNC) joinery machines. The Timber Engineering Reference described cadwork 3d as broadly featured with modules for heavy timber roof, heavy timber frame, log structures, panelization, CAM fabrication, parametric variant module, glulam lamination design, and a bill of materials. The file format is .3d.
- cadwork 2dr/cadwork Engineer: An infrastructure design product with engineering features for topographic and road. The file format is .2dr.
- cadwork Lexocad: A commercial BIM 3D design infraBIM product, which includes 4D scheduling, 5D pricing, and 6D execution. When combined with cadwork 2dr, Lexocad provides a BIM planning and construction interface for construction crews and construction engineers. Lexocad has free cadwork viewers, which allows zooming, panning, and printing; however, the freeware version does not allow modifying a file. The file format is .lxz.
- cadwork BIMteam: A webGL model interface with total station functions; an alternative is Autodesk BIM 360.
- cadwork BIMview: A webGL viewer.

=== Research and development collaborations ===
- University:
  - cadwork informatik AG is an active member of the Center for Integrated Facility Engineering (CIFE), Stanford University.
  - cadwork informatik AG partnered on a "Science to Market" project with the Institute of 4D Technologies (i4Ds), University of Applied Sciences Northwestern Switzerland. This project included the Swiss Federation Innovation Agency (KTI/CTI) and industry partner Swiss Federal Railways Corporation (SBB) in Bern.
  - cadwork informatik AG supported the development of shadow algorithms at Brno University of Technology, Czech Republic
- Industry: Swiss Research Centre for Rationalization in Building and Civil Engineering CRB, Basel; collaboration on integrating ontology representation through BIM of products, processes, and applied resources.
- Software: BuildingSMART; collaboration on infra-BIM for roads, rail, bridges, and waterways.

=== Education and certifications ===
The cadwork customer base is a network of practitioners; through a long-term client relationship, cadwork continues software support, development of custom solutions, and application education.

In education, cadwork works with collaborators to provide continuing education opportunities, such as with the Tall Wood Institute.

In North America, cadwork collaborates with the Timber Framers Guild apprenticeship education in collaboration with the United Brotherhood of Carpenters and Joiners of America.

=== Manufacturing ===
cadwork is the primary fabrication software used by timber manufacturers globally, as such, cadwork has a diverse network of manufacturers throughout the world. To work in timber manufacturing, knowledge of cadwork is a criterion so to allow for operating and programming of CNC machines.

Modeling: Timber Frame Headquarters

Fabricators

- Timber Artisans
- Rocky Mountain Joinery
- Euclid Timber Frames

Equipment

- Dürr AG HOMAG woodworking tools
- Hundegger machinery

== Company history ==
cadwork informatik AG was founded in 1988 as a continuation of the research by the Swiss Center for Electronics and Microtechnology (CSEM) and the École Polytechnique Fédérale de Lausanne (EPFL). In 1992, cadwork expanded outside the Swiss market by opening cadwork Germany in Hildesheim.

- 1980, the initial developers envisioned cadwork as a tool for the watch industry; developed by the Centre suisse d'électronique et de microtechnique (CSEM).
- 1982, the École Polytechnique Fédérale de Lausanne (EPFL) continued developing cadwork in Fortran and compiled in 32 or 64 bits on workstations, such as those from Apollo Computer, Digital Equipment Corporation (VAX and Alpha platforms), and Hewlett-Packard.
- 1989, Cadwork informatik was founded as a Swiss society in Basel, Switzerland.
- 1992, cadwork informatik Software GmbH, founded in Hildesheim.
- 1996, cadwork dropped support for workstations and became Microsoft Windows compliant.
- 2004, cadwork started the development of Lexocad.
- 2016, cadwork France Sàrl was founded in the East of France.

== Recognition of industry practitioners ==
The "cadwork competition" provides recognition for aesthetically pleasing timber construction. There are various categories; in 2019, Laminated Timber Solutions received a public buildings award for their Molenbeek-Saint-Jean passive building constructed entirely of cross-laminated timber (CLT). This residential structure consists of 17 units (single- and dual-story apartments) with ancillary common parts.

== See also ==
- Virtual design and construction
- Industry Foundation Classes (IFC)
- Open Design Alliance (OpenDWG)
- 3D ACIS Modeler (ACIS)
- Construction management
- Construction engineering
