= Ian Smith (civil engineer) =

Canadian and Swiss civil engineer

- Born: Ian F. C. Smith
- Education: University of Waterloo (BSc, 1978); University of Cambridge (PhD, 1982)
- Scientific career
- Fields: Civil engineering, Artificial intelligence, Engineering informatics
- Workplaces: Technical University of Munich (Founding Director, TUM Georg Nemetschek Institute); EPFL (Emeritus); Carnegie Mellon University (Adjunct Professor)

Ian F. C. Smith is a Canadian and Swiss civil engineer. He is Emeritus Professor at the École Polytechnique Fédérale de Lausanne (EPFL) in Switzerland and was the founding director of the TUM Georg Nemetschek Institute Artificial Intelligence for the Built World at the Technical University of Munich in Germany.

== Career ==
Smith completed his undergraduate degree in civil engineering at the University of Waterloo, Canada (1978) in a five-year program of alternating four-month periods of studying and industrial experience where he worked in structural design offices, a boundary-layer wind tunnel lab (University of Western Ontario) and two steel fabricators in Canada.

After completing his PhD at the Engineering Department of the University of Cambridge, UK in 1982, he continued his research and teaching career at the École Polytechnique Fédérale de Lausanne (EPFL), Switzerland. Starting in the Civil Engineering Department (1982-1991), he worked on measurement systems, fatigue, and fracture mechanics in several collaborations with industry partners.

He switched to the Artificial Intelligence Laboratory in the Computer Science Department (1991-1996) in order to focus on software applications for the construction industry. Back in the Civil Engineering Department, he was appointed associate professor in 1999 and Full Professor in 2005.

Smith was Head of the Applied Computing and Mechanics Laboratory (IMAC) (2000-2020) and Chair of the Structural Engineering Institute at the School of Architecture, Civil and Environmental Engineering (2001-2006).

He was the Founding Director of the TUM Georg Nemetschek Institute Artificial Intelligence for the Built World, Technical University of Munich (TUM), from March 1, 2022 to February 28, 2025. Smith is also emeritus Professor at the Swiss Federal Institute of Technology (EPFL) in Lausanne, Switzerland and an adjunct professor at Carnegie Mellon University, USA since 2011.

His research activity is on the intersection of computer science with the built environment. In 1993, he founded the European Group for Structural Engineering Applications of Artificial Intelligence (EG-SEA-AI). This group later became the European Group for Intelligent Computing in Engineering (EG-ICE).

In 2003, he co-authored the textbook Engineering Informatics: Fundamentals of Computer-Aided Engineering (Wiley), the 2nd edition of which appeared in June 2013. In 2004, he was elected to the Swiss Academy of Engineering Sciences and in 2005, he received the Computing in Civil Engineering Award from the ASCE.

From 2010 to 2020, he directed a second research group in Asia as Principal Investigator at the ETH Future Cities Laboratory, CREATE, Singapore. In 2022, he was elected to the National Academy of Construction, USA.
