= Quantapoint =

Technology and services company

Quantapoint, Inc.
- Type: Private
- Industry: 3D Laser Scanning Technology and Services
- Predecessor: K^{2}T
- Founded: Pittsburgh, Pennsylvania, United States (1991)
- Headquarters: Houston, Texas, United States
- Area served: North America, Latin America, European Union, Nigeria, South Africa, South East Asia
- Key people: John R. Wilson (President and CEO); Eric Hoffman (Founder and Executive Vice President)
- Products: PRISM 3D (3D laser scanning data viewer); QuantaCAD (3D laser scanning data integration with CAD); AccessPoint (3D laser scanning data integration with facility information)
- Services: 3D Laser Scanning; Tie Point Certification; Design Validation; Fabrication Verification; Construction Visualization; As-built Documentation
- Number of employees: Approximately 70+ (2013)
- Website: www.quantapoint.com

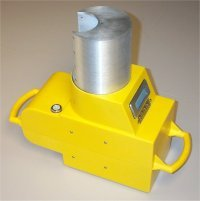
Quantapoint SceneModeler 9 Laser Scanner

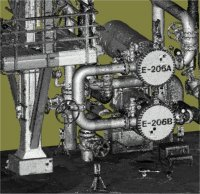
Quantapoint Laser Models

Quantapoint, Inc. is a technology and services company that develops and uses patented 3D laser scanning hardware and software. Quantapoint creates a Digital Facility using 3D laser scanning and then provides visualization, analysis, quality control, decision support and documentation services for buildings, museums, refineries, chemical plants, nuclear and fossil-fuel power plants, offshore platforms and other structures.

== History ==
Quantapoint was founded as K^{2}T, Inc (or K2T) in Pittsburgh, Pennsylvania in 1991 by Eric Hoffman, Pradeep Khosla, Takeo Kanade and other Carnegie Mellon University faculty members. K^{2}T focused on creating custom robotics and 3D range-finding imaging systems to help them navigate complex environments, and the 360-degree phase-based 3D laser scanner named SceneModeler created in 1997.

The company name was changed to Quantapoint in 1999 to reflect the focus on 3D laser scanning hardware, software and services.

Initially, Quantapoint focused on using 3D laser scanning to "digitize" buildings and create 2D drawings, 3D models and/or other animations or visualizations for renovations, additions or historic preservation. Notable projects include the Museum of Modern Art, the Theban Mapping Project in the Valley of the Kings, Monticello and the Guggenheim Museum.

Since 2002, Quantapoint has served the chemical, petroleum and power industries both globally and within the United States. Quantapoint has also worked with the United States General Services Administration (GSA).

Quantapoint has received several patents and awards for the 3D laser scanner hardware and 3D laser scanning data software that it has developed.

Quantapoint was acquired by Qualspec of Houston, Texas, in July 2015.

== 3D laser scanner hardware ==
Quantapoint uses both its own 3D laser scanner hardware, the SceneModeler 5 and SceneModeler 9, and the Photon from Faro Systems. Quantapoint has a fleet of more than twenty (20) 3D laser scanners.

== Digital facility ==
The Quantapoint Digital Facility consists of the following:

- Laser Models: Quantapoint technology that integrates all 3D laser scanning data to provide detailed, high-definition 3D solid "models" of a facility. Quantapoint avoids using the term "point cloud" or "cloud of points".
- Laser Images: Photo-realistic, perspective-corrected panoramic images of individual 3D laser scans.

== 3D laser scanning data software ==
Quantapoint provides the following software for using the 3D laser scanning data in the Digital Facility:

- PRISM 3D: View and interact with Laser Images and Laser Models directly.
- CAD Conversion Option for PRISM 3D: Import 3D CAD models into PRISM 3D to view with or clash against Laser Models.
- QuantaCAD: View and interact Laser Images and Laser Models within 3D computer-aided design (CAD) software, including AutoCAD, AutoPlant, AVEVA Review, MicroStation XM, PDS, PDMS, Revit, SmartMarine 3D, SmartPlant Review and SmartPlant 3D.
- AccessPoint: View and interact Laser Images and Laser Models via the Internet and integrate with facility information.

== Alliances/software development relationships ==
Quantapoint has alliances or software development relationships to integrate laser data with software from Autodesk, AVEVA, Bentley Systems and Intergraph.

== Locations ==
Quantapoint has locations within the United States (Pittsburgh, Houston, Los Angeles), England, Scotland and Nigeria. Quantapoint also uses representatives in various countries, such as Mexico, Venezuela, South Africa, Malaysia and Brazil.

== Patents ==
Quantapoint has been issued the following patents in the United States and has filed for similar patents in the EU, Canada and Japan:

- 360-degree 3D Laser Scanning: 6,034,803, 6,373,612, 6,906,837 and 7,365,891.
- 3D Laser Scan Registration: 7,180,072.
- Creating Layout from 3D Laser Scan Data: 6,446,030 and 7,127,378.
