= Spacewell =

- Formerly: MCS
- Industry: Building management software
- Founded: 1989
- Founder: Marcel Eeckhout
- Headquarters: Antwerp, Belgium
- Website: spacewell.com

Spacewell is a software and technology company working with the real estate and facility management industries. The company is headquartered in Antwerp, Belgium, with offices in Europe and APAC. Spacewell is owned by the Nemetschek Group, a multinational company.

== History ==
The company was founded as a consultancy firm called MCS in 1989 in Antwerp by Marcel Eeckhout. It started with developing a product in the area of CAD drawings for built assets. The company's team developed a technology to turn these drawings into data, so that non-specialists were able to work with them. Over time a range of real estate, facility management and workplace software were added, running on a central database, resulting in an Integrated Workplace Management System (IWMS). In 2012, MCS was taken over in a leveraged management buy-in by Koen Matthijs and Steven Lambert.

In April 2016, MCS received €6 million financing from investors PE Group and Jadeberg Partners for integration of IoT into facility management. On August 28, 2018, MCS was acquired (100% of its shares) by the Frankfurt Stock Exchange listed Nemetschek Group, a software provider in the architecture, engineering and construction industries. Six months after the purchase, in February 2019, MCS was rebranded to Spacewell.

In January 2019, Spacewell acquired Dutch SaaS company Axxerion and in December 2020, Spain-based Dexma.

=== Software ===
Spacewell cloud software connects with the IoT (Internet of Things) to focus on the efficient usage of buildings, e.g. optimizing occupancy, air quality, space and energy management, as well as providing real-time analytics about the buildings.
