= Graphisoft BIM Server =

Graphisoft BIM server
- Developer(s): Graphisoft
- Initial release: September 2009
- Stable release: 2 / May 1, 2010; 14 years ago
- Operating system: Windows XP, Windows Vista, Windows 7, Mac OS X Leopard, Mac OS X Snow Leopard
- Type: 3D computer graphics, CAD, Building Information Modeling
- License: Proprietary commercial software
- Website: graphisoft.com/bim_server/

Graphisoft BIM Server is software for building information model based team collaboration developed for architects, interior designers and planners by Graphisoft. Graphisoft BIM Server acts as a central file storage, document and version management tool and a framework for facilitating interaction and collaboration between architects working with multiple ArchiCAD instances on the same project file from remote locations over the Internet. The necessary client-side software is a built in component of ArchiCAD versions starting with version 13.

== Features ==
Graphisoft's BIM Server is based on a patented technology.

Graphisoft's latest collaboration service —unlike the former TeamWork feature which was a file-based technology without a server-side component— is a database driven technology, therefore every time a change is sent to the centrally administered project, not the whole project, but only the changed elements are sent between clients and the server. This drastically decreased the volume of the necessary network traffic compared to the previous technology, facilitating a practically real-time collaborative environment between remote users with ordinary internet connection.

Graphisoft BIM server allows to set up different users and roles for the shared projects, where architects and draftsmen can easily reserve certain parts of the project to further elaborate. In the meantime other members can easily identify who is currently working on a specific building element. Having finished the actual tasks, a user can release the previously reserved elements or other group members can request the release with the built-in communication functions such as instant messages within ArchiCAD between team members.
