= Sonata (building design software) =

Sonata was a 3D building design software application developed in the early 1980s and is now regarded as a forerunner of today's building information modeling applications.

Sonata was commercially released in 1986, having been developed by Jonathan Ingram independently and sold to T2 Solutions (renamed from GMW Computers in 1987 - which was eventually bought by Alias|Wavefront), and was sold as a successor to GMW's RUCAPS. It ran on workstation computer hardware (by contrast, other 2D computer-aided design (CAD) systems could run on personal computers). The system was not expensive, according to Michael Phiri. Reiach Hall purchased "three Sonata workstations on Silicon Graphics machines, at a total cost of approximately £2000 each" [1990 prices]. Approximately 1,000 seats were sold between 1985 and 1992. However, as a BIM application, in addition to geometric modelling, it could model complete buildings, including complex parametrics, costs and staging of the construction process.

Archicad founder Gábor Bojár has acknowledged that Sonata "was more advanced in 1986 than Archicad at that time", adding that it "surpassed already the matured definition of 'BIM' specified only about one and a half decade later".

Many projects were designed and built using Sonata, including Peddle Thorp Architect's Rod Laver Arena in 1987, and Gatwick Airport North Terminal Domestic Facility by Taylor Woodrow. The US-based architect HKS used the software in 1992 to design a horse racing facility (Lone Star Park in Grand Prairie, Texas) and subsequently purchased the successor product, Reflex.

Target Australia Pty. Ltd. the Australian discount department store retailer bought two Sonata licences in 1992 to replace two RUCAPS workstations originally from Coles Supermarkets. The software was run on two Silicon Graphics IRIS Indigo workstations. Staff were trained to use the software including the parametric language. The simple but powerful parametrics enable productivity gains in documenting buildings and fixture layouts. The object-oriented system suited the standard components installed by the retailer. Combined with the multiple project access (MPA) networking on the Unix operating system platform, a key selection criterion for continuing with the RUCAPS-Sonata architecture enabled the retailer's 50 stores in 5 years program during the late 1990s be executed with a small team. More workstations were purchased, including Silicon Graphics IRIS Indigo and Personal IRIS from the Queensland University of Technology. Year 2000 funding enabled the purchase of eight Silicon Graphics O2 workstations bringing the network to 11 workstations. The department continued to follow the development of Reflex and had contact with other users including Jeff Findlay at Peddle Thorp Architects. The business change to PTC and the direction away from building to a mechanical engineering system combined with Silicon Graphics move to Intel x86 architecture led Target to change to the most similar CAD software, Graphisoft’s Archicad.

The Sonata business was founded in 1984 and, by one account it "disappeared in a mysterious, corporate black hole, somewhere in eastern Canada in 1992," after new owner Alias Research discontinued marketing of the product. Ingram then went on to develop Reflex, bought out by Parametric Technology Corporation (PTC) in 1996.
