= Nemetschek =

German software company

Nemetschek SE
- Company type: Societas Europaea
- Traded as: FWB: NEM; MDAX component
- ISIN: DE0006452907
- Industry: Architecture, Engineering, Construction, Multimedia
- Founded: 1963; 63 years ago in Munich, Germany
- Headquarters: Munich, Germany
- Key people: Yves Padrines (CEO); Louise Öfverström (CFO); Usman Shuja; Marc Nezet
- Revenue: ▲€995.6 million (2024)
- Operating income: ▲€301.0 million (2024)
- Net income: ▲€175.4 million (2024)
- Total assets: ▲€2,136.3 million (2024)
- Number of employees: 4,000 (end 2024)
- Website: www.nemetschek.com

Nemetschek Group is a vendor of software for architects, engineers and the construction industry. The company develops and distributes software for planning, designing, building and managing buildings and real estate, as well as for media and entertainment.

== History ==
=== 20th century ===
The company was founded by Prof. Georg Nemetschek in 1963, and initially went by the name of Ingenieurbüro für das Bauwesen (engineering firm for the construction industry), focusing on structural design. It was one of the first companies in the industry to use computers and developed software for engineers, initially for its own requirements. In 1977, Nemetschek started distributing its program Statik 97/77 for civil engineering.

At the Hanover Fair in 1980, Nemetschek presented a software package for integrated calculation and design of standard components for solid construction. This was the first software enabling computer-aided engineering (CAE) on microcomputers, and the product remained unique on the market for many years.

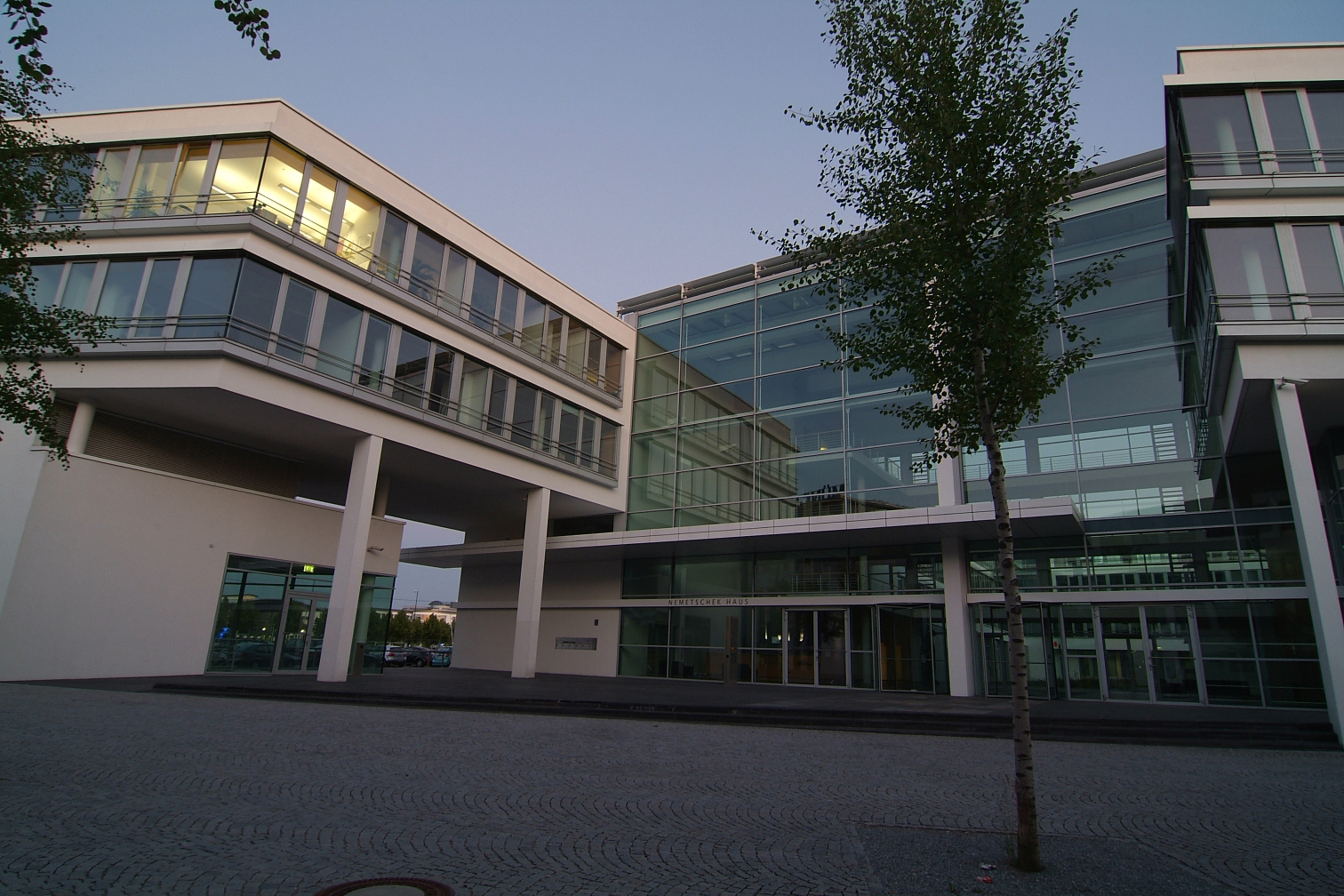
Nemetschek AG headquarters in Munich

In 1989, Nemetschek Programmsystem GmbH was founded and was responsible for software distribution; Georg Nemetschek's engineering firm continued to be in charge of program development. The main product, Allplan – a CAD system for architects and engineers, was launched in 1984. This allowed designers to model buildings in three dimensions. Nemetschek began to expand internationally in the 1980s. By 1996, the company had subsidiaries in eight European countries and distribution partners in nine European countries; since 1992, it has also had a development site in Bratislava, Slovakia.

The first acquisitions were made at the end of the 1990s, including the structural design program vendor Friedrich + Lochner. The company, operating as Nemetschek AG since 1994, went public in 1999 (it has been listed in the Prime Standard market segment and the TecDAX in Frankfurt ever since).

=== 21st century ===
Two major company takeovers followed in 2000: the American firm Diehl Graphsoft (now Vectorworks) and Maxon Computer GmbH, with its Cinema 4D software for visualization and animation. In 2006, Nemetschek acquired Hungary's Graphisoft (for its key product ArchiCAD), and Belgium's SCIA International.

In November 2013, Nemetschek acquired the MEP software provider Data Design System (DDS). On 31 October 2014, the acquisition of Bluebeam Software, Inc. was concluded. At the end of 2015, Solibri was acquired.

Since 2016, the company has operated as Nemetschek SE. Later that year, SDS/2 was acquired. In 2017, it acquired dRofus and RISA. MCS Solutions was acquired in 2018, closely followed by the acquisition of Axxerion B.V and Plandatis and subsequently rebranded to Spacewell. Other acquisitions have been completed at a brand level (for example, Redshift Rendering Technologies, Red Giant and Pixologic were acquired by Maxon, DEXMA by Spacewell).

Since 18 September 2018, Nemetschek is listed in the MDAX in addition to its TecDAX listing.

In the summer of 2024, the Nemetschek Group closed its largest acquisition in company history, adding the SaaS-based field management software GoCanvas, with its sister company Sitedocs.

Among others, Nemetschek is a member of the BuildingSMART e.V. and the Deutsche Gesellschaft für Nachhaltiges Bauen (DGNB) (German Sustainable Building Council), actively advocating for open building information modeling (BIM) standards ("open BIM") in the AEC/O industry.

== Business units ==
Since 2008, Nemetschek has acted as a holding company with four business units:

- Planning & Design (Architecture and Civil Engineering)
- Build & Construct
- Manage & Operate
- Media & Entertainment.

The holding company maintains 13 product brands, covering the whole building lifecycle, from planning to operations.

== Shareholders ==
- 38.9% foundations of Prof. Georg Nemetschek
- 4.0% Nemetschek Foundation
- 5.4% Nemetschek family (Georg Nemetschek's sons)
- 2.7% Georg Nemetschek (founder)
- 49% public float

== Philanthropy ==
A significant percentage of total shares of the Nemetschek group are held by charitable foundations founded by Prof. Georg Nemetschek.

=== Nemetschek Foundation ===
The Nemetschek Foundation was founded in 2007 and aims to strengthen democratic institutions in Germany by the means of a number of initiatives, particularly in the field of education.

=== Nemetschek Innovation Foundation ===
The Nemetschek Innovation Foundation sponsors research and development in the field of planning, construction, use, and maintenance of built environments and structures. To fund the institute, Georg Nemetschek transferred 350,000 shares of Nemetschek Group to the foundation in 2020. In particular, the Innovation Foundation is known for researching applications of artificial intelligence in architecture, construction, and engineering.

==== Georg Nemetschek Institute - Artificial Intelligence for the Built World ====
The Georg Nemetschek Institute - Artificial Intelligence for the Built World was founded in 2020 as a research institute within the Technical University of Munich. The institute was formed with €50 million in funding from the Nemetschek Innovation Foundation to be disbursed over a period of 10 years. €30 million of the total funding was marked for research projects.

The institute specializes in the research of artificial intelligence applications for the built environment, including planning, construction and maintenance of structures and infrastructure. Shortly after its founding, the company made its first call for research projects, leading to formation of six projects in the fields of digital twins, concrete analysis, infrastructure maintenance planning, structural health monitoring, transport network design, and construction robotics.

In 2021, the institute hosted its first symposium on the potential and expected influence of AI on architecture, civil engineering, construction, operation, and asset management (AECOM) were discussed. Another symposium was held in 2024 at Campus Garching.

As of 2025, the institute was headed by Prof. Ian Smith.

== See also ==
- Comparison of CAD editors for architecture, engineering and construction (AEC)
