= Reflex (building design software) =

Software

Reflex was a 3D building design software application developed in the mid 1980s and - along with its predecessor Sonata - is now regarded as a forerunner to today's building information modelling applications.

== History ==
The application was developed by two former GMW Computers employees who had been involved with Sonata. After Sonata had "disappeared in a mysterious, corporate black hole, somewhere in eastern Canada in 1992," Jonathan Ingram and colleague Gerard Gartside then went on to develop Reflex, bought for $30 million by Parametric Technology Corporation (PTC) in July 1996.

PTC had identified the architecture, engineering and construction market as a target for its parametric modelling solutions, and bought Reflex to expand into the sector. However, the fit between Reflex and PTC's existing solutions was poor, and PTC's Pro/Reflex gained little market traction; PTC then sold the product to another US company, The Beck Group, in 1997, (Note: Some accounts of the date of this transaction vary: Beck Technology, originally an internal group within Beck Construction, says it acquired the intellectual property rights to Reflex from PTC in 2000.) where it formed the kernel of a parametric estimating package called DESTINI.

Around the same time, several people from PTC set up a new company, Charles River Software (renamed Revit Technology Corporation in 2000, later (2002) bought by Autodesk). Leonid Raiz and Irwin Jungreis obtained from PTC a non-exclusive, source code development license for Reflex as part of their severance package. In the words of Jerry Laiserin: "While Autodesk Revit may not contain genomic snippets of Reflex code, Revit clearly is spiritual heir to a lineage of BIM 'begats' — RUCAPS begat Sonata, Sonata begat Reflex, and Reflex begat Revit."

In a 2017 letter to AEC Magazine, Jungreis said:

"After receiving several hours of instruction in the software architecture of Reflex from Reflex developers, we decided not to use it as our starting point because of several important differences at the very foundations of the software. At that point, we put it aside and never looked at it again. ... Revit was not based on Reflex. No code from Reflex was used...."

However, Ingram, in his 2020 book Understanding BIM: The Past, Present and Future, shows much of the functionality of Reflex is duplicated in Revit. A 2022 account of the history of BIM by Kasper Miller asserts: "Reflex and Revit shared a myriad of features — so much so that it is fairly clear where the Revit team found much of its inspiration".
