= Archicad library part =

Archicad library part is the basic item through which the CAD software Archicad handles external dynamic content elements which are grouped into libraries. A library part is a file in a library.

A library part can be any file used by Archicad for the following purposes:

- a file with GSM extension containing a model written in GDL or using 2D- or 3D binaries
- a background image for rendering
- an image for texture mapping for 3D and rendering
- a text file for listing
- a LightWorks material file (LWI)
- a DXF file
- a file of any type, which is registered by Archicad or by an add-on as library part through Library Manager

Usually a library part refers to an object scripted in GDL.

== See also ==
- Archicad
- Geometric Description Language
