= BIMx =

Software

Graphisoft BIMx
- Developer: Graphisoft
- Initial release: June 2011
- Operating system: Windows; Mac OS X; iOS; Android
- Type: 3D computer graphics; CAD; building information modeling
- License: Proprietary commercial software
- Website: bimx.com

BIMx is a set of desktop and mobile software tools to interactively present the 3D model and 2D documentation of Building Information Models created with ArchiCAD through a much simpler and intuitive interface than ArchiCAD's complex BIM authoring environment's UI. 3D models with 2D drawing sheets exported to BIMx document format can be viewed with native viewer applications developed for Apple iOS, Android, Mac OS X, and Microsoft Windows operating systems. BIMx presents three dimensional building models in an interactive way similar to First-person shooter video games. Clients, consultants and builders can virtually walk through and make measurements in the 3D model without the need for installing ArchiCAD. The real-time cutaway function can help to discover the construction details of the displayed building model. 2D construction documentation can be accessed directly from the BIMx Hyper-model's 3D model views providing more detailed information about the building.

== BIMx authoring and viewer applications ==
The Graphisoft BIMx software suite consists of three different applications: the desktop publisher software, the viewer apps for desktop and mobile and the web viewer application:

- ArchiCAD (OS X / Windows): The BIM authoring tool, a commercial application, which can publish BIMx Hyper-models.
- BIMx App (iOS / Android): A free app that can be downloaded from the iTunes App Store for displaying 3D models on iPad, iPhone, or other Android-based smartphones or tablets. In-app purchase is also available at the free BIMx iOS app for buying PRO license to view hyper-models or a model-sharing license to share a specific model with any stakeholder.
- BIMx PRO App (iOS): A commercial application that can be purchased from the iTunes App Store for displaying the entire BIMx Hyper-model: not only the 3D model of the building, but also its two dimensional architectural documentation set as drawn and detailed with ARCHICAD. In-app purchase is available for buying a model-sharing license to share a specific model with any stakeholder.
- BIMx Desktop Viewer (OS X / Windows): A desktop application that can be freely downloaded to view BIMx models. (3D models only, as the desktop viewer cannot display the drawing sheets.)
- BIMx Web Viewer: A free web service to access BIMx Hyper-models in a browser without any installation. It is an integrated part of the GRAPHISOFT BIMx Model Transfer service.

== History ==
The core engine of BIMx was originally developed by a Swedish developer: Zermatt Virtual Reality Software. The original product was released as an add-on for ArchiCAD 9. Graphisoft acquired Zermatt in 2010 and released Virtual Building Explorer for ArchiCAD 13 and ArchiCAD 14. Virtual Building Explorer for ArchiCAD 15 was renamed to BIMx or BIM Explorer.

== BIMx Hyper-models ==
The BIMx Hyper-model concept provides easy access to drawing sheets (such as floor plans and sections) directly from the virtual environment generated from the 3D building models. The 2D drawing sheets of a BIMx Hyper-model can only be opened with either the paid BIMx PRO application or by an in-app purchase. There is also an in-app purchase available for sharing a Hyper-model with unlimited number of stakeholders.

== Awards ==
- Construction Computing Awards 2013 — Mobile Technology of the Year
- Architizer A+ Awards 2016 - Product/Apps
- Construction Computing Awards 2018 - Mobile / Field Technology App of 2018
- AIA ‘Best of Show’ awards - 2019

== Reviews ==
- BIMx Docs — AECbytes Product Review
- Top 10 Apps for Architects — archdaily.com
