= TMW Systems =

American software company

- Company type: Public subsidiary
- Industry: Computer software,
- Founded: 1983; 43 years ago
- Headquarters: Mayfield Heights, Ohio, United States
- Products: Software systems for supply chain management and transportation management system
- Number of employees: Approx. 700 (2016)
- Parent: Trimble Navigation
- Website: www.tmwsystems.com

TMW Systems is an American software company that is the developer of enterprise management software for the surface transportation services industry, including logistics, freight, trucking and heavy-duty repair and maintenance. It has been part of Trimble Inc. since 2012 and its products have been rebranded under the Trimble name.

The company was founded in Cleveland, Ohio and now has offices in Dallas, Indianapolis, Mayfield Heights, Nashville, Oklahoma City, Raleigh, Vancouver and Melbourne, Australia.

TMW's supplies solutions cover the transportation services sector. It supplies technology for improved operational efficiencies, transactional velocity, resource utilization and long-term profitability.The company has customers in the trucking, 3PL, brokerage, private fleet, construction, municipal government, retail repair and waste management industries.

== History ==
Following the Motor Carrier Act of 1980, which deregulated the trucking industry, Tom Weisz founded TMW Systems in 1983.

In 2005, Wachovia Capital Partners and PepperTree Capital Management acquired TMW Systems. In 2006, TMW Systems acquired Vancouver-based Maddocks Systems, Canada's largest provider of trucking software. TMW Systems also acquired Durham-based TMT Software Company, a fleet maintenance software provider, in May 2007. TMW Systems completed its acquisition of Integrated Decision Support Corporation in September 2007. In late 2009, TMW Systems acquired Innovative Computing Corporation of Nashville, an enterprise software company. In May 2011, TMW Systems announced the acquisition of Appian Logistics Software—a leading logistics and supply chain software provider.

On August 27, 2012, TMW Systems was acquired by Trimble of Sunnyvale, California for $335 Million in cash.

== Products ==
TMW Systems products are broken down into four categories: 1) Enterprise Transportation Software (for brokers, carriers, 3PLs and fleet operations), 2) Optimization Software (for transportation), 3) Asset Maintenance Software (for captive fleets or repair centers), and 4) Appian Software (for logistics).

=== Enterprise Transportation Software ===
- TMWSuite
- TMW Go! (Apple iPhone app)
- TruckMate
- TL2000
- Innovative IES, Innovative Access and Innovative Access Plus

=== Optimization Software ===
- IDSC Netwise
- IDSC ExpertFuel
- IDSC TripAlert
- IDSC MatchAdvice

=== Asset Maintenance Software ===
- TMT Fleet Maintenance
- TMT Service Center
- Cloud Services Hosting

== User Conference ==
TMW Systems hosts an annual user conference called in.sight User Conference + Expo (formerly TransForum). The conference is open to other Trimble companies, vendors, and TMW customers. At the conference, TMW customers attend classroom sessions on TMW software, listen to guest speakers and network with TMW staff and other customers.
