= Cadwork =

cadwork
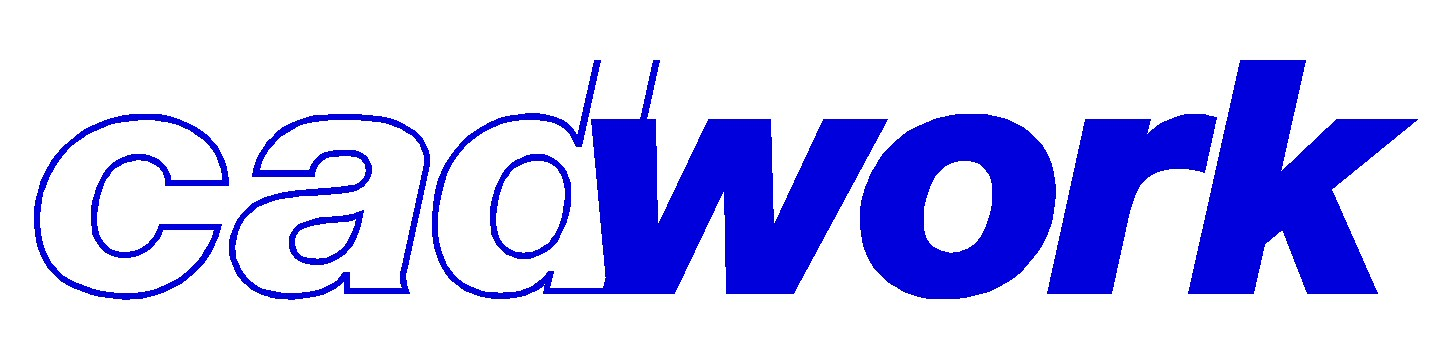
- Developer(s): Cadwork informatik AG
- Stable release: 30 / 2023
- Operating system: Windows, HP-UX
- Type: BIM, CAD, CAM
- License: Proprietary
- Website: http://cadwork.com

cadwork is a software suite that includes IFC-based virtual design and construction software tools developed by cadwork informatik AG. This suite of tools provides a solution for 3D wood manufacturing (Computer-aided manufacturing, CAM) and a solution for Building Information Modeling that includes project planning and control functions of 3D quantity takeoff, 4D scheduling, 5D pricing, and 6D execution.

The primary application is in light frame woods and heavy timber construction: The Architectural design, structural engineering, and construction carpentry phases are supported with novel features for glue laminated timber and stairs

cadwork viewers are free and provide zoom, pan, and print: the freeware version does not allow modifying a file. Three file types define the level of sophistication implemented through the model.

- .2d, .2dc (2 dimensions drawing)
- .3d, .3dc (3 dimensions drawings)
- .2dv (parametric elements)

Following an international shift towards open-source software standards, cadwork is IFC compatible (Industry Foundation Classes) with several certifications, such as IFC 2x3 (Import ISO/PAS).

== See also ==
- Virtual design and construction
- Industry Foundation Classes (IFC)
- Open Design Alliance (OpenDWG)
- 3D ACIS Modeler (ACIS)
- Construction management
- Construction engineering
