= GMW Architects =

British architectural practice

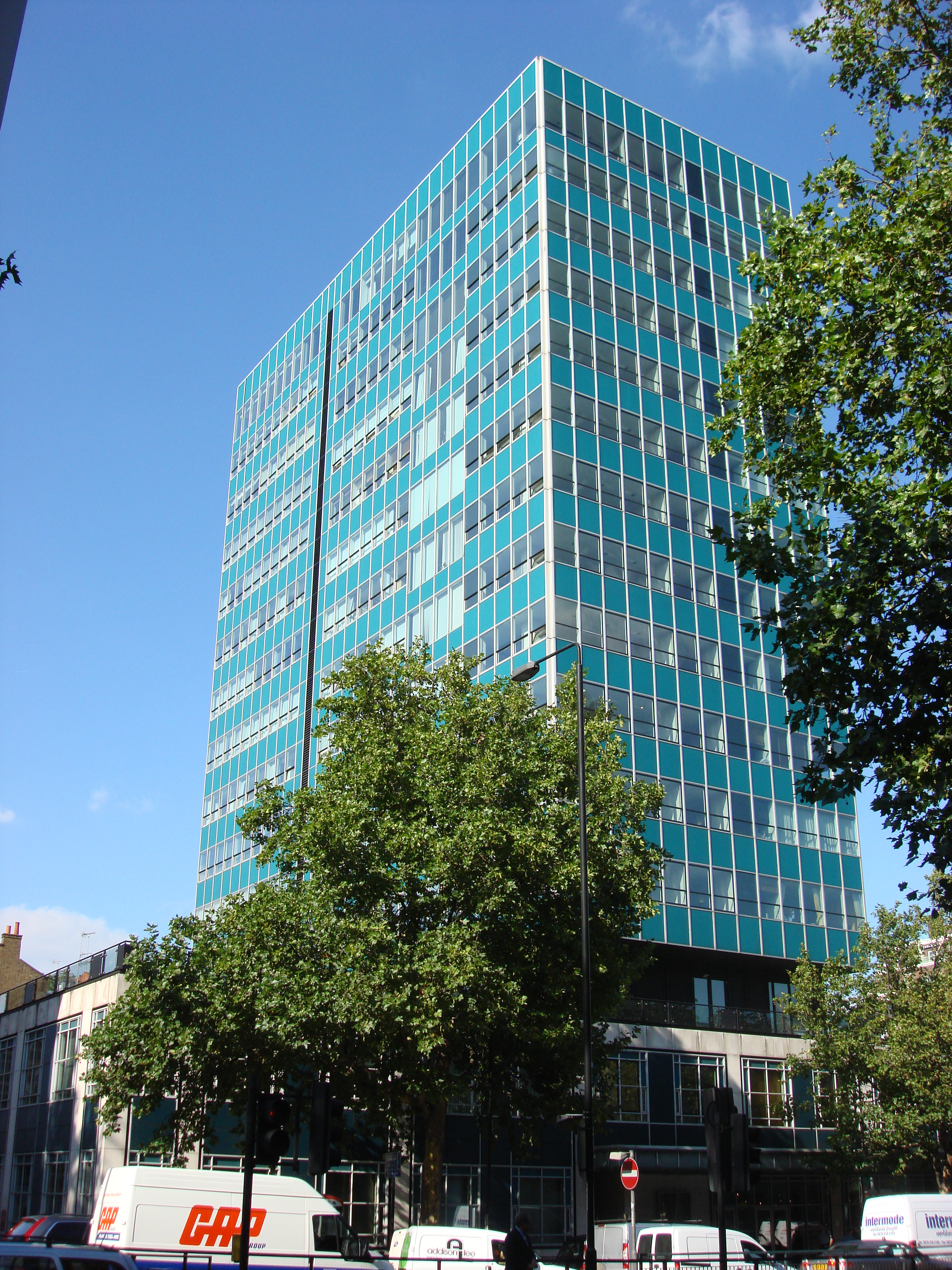
Castrol House designed by GMW Architects and one of the first curtain wall buildings in the UK

GMW Architects was an architectural practice based in the United Kingdom. In August 2015, the firm was taken over by Scott Brownrigg.

== History ==
The practice was established in 1947 by Frank Gollins (1910–1999), James Melvin (1912–2012) and Edmund Ward (1912–1998), and operated as Gollins Melvin Ward. In the 1950s it designed Castrol House, a tower on Marylebone Road in London, notable as one of the first uses of curtain walling on a building in the United Kingdom, and the central campus for the University of Sheffield.

In the 1960s it went on to design two buildings at Undershaft in the City of London: the 28-storey Commercial Union Tower, the first building in the city to exceed the height of St Paul's Cathedral, and the now demolished headquarters of P&O. These buildings both featured an innovative structure by which the office floors are hung by steel rods from cantilevers extending out from the concrete core, rather than being supported from ground level.

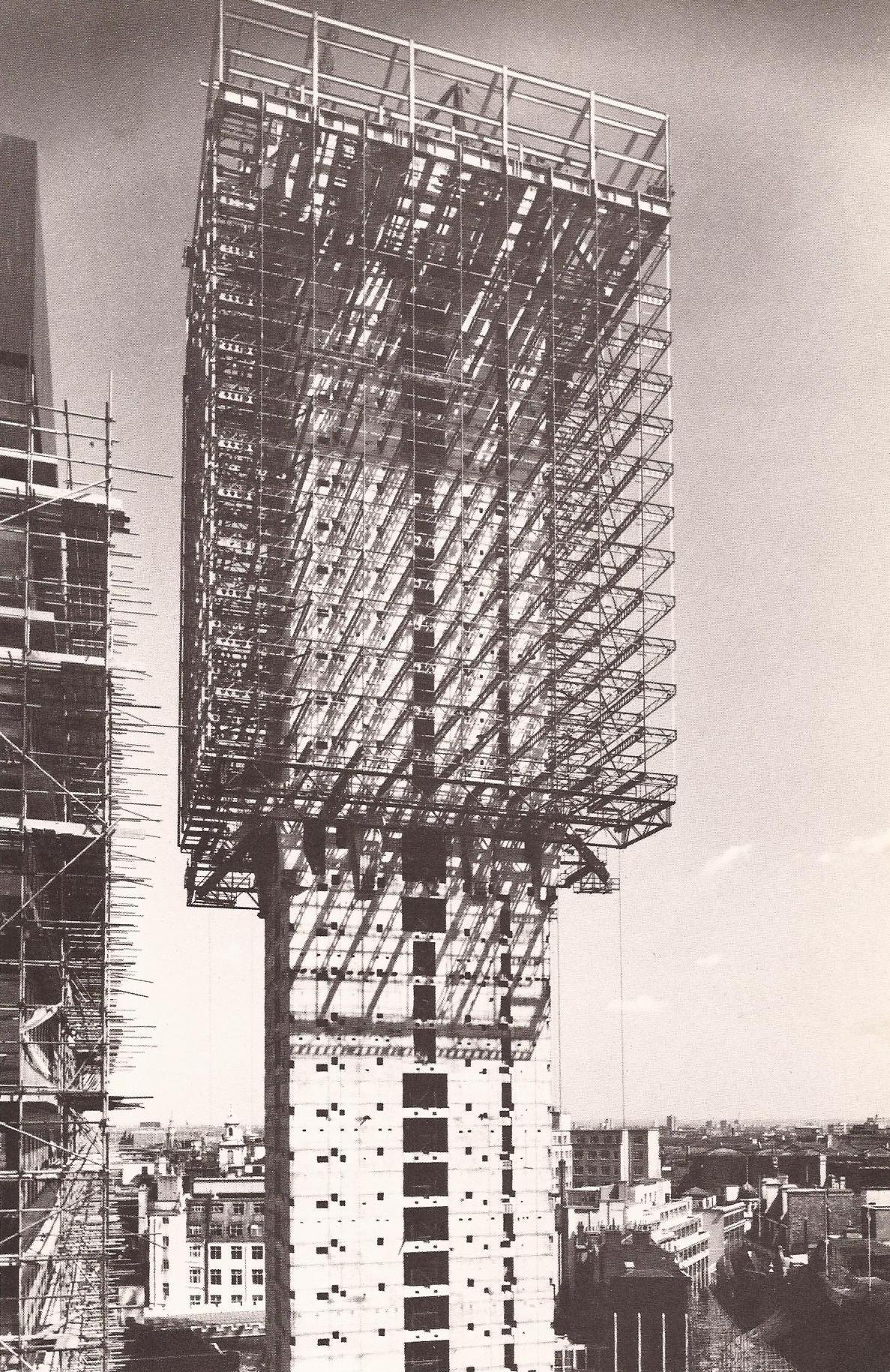
Commercial Union Tower (now St Helen's) under construction, 1968

The three founders retired in 1974, leaving a well-established practice. Soon afterward, GMW was awarded a commission to design the King Saud University in Saudi Arabia.

In 1983, the firm was appointed to design the new Barclays headquarters building at 54 Lombard Street; eleven years later, the practice was appointed to handle the refurbishment of Tower 42 in London.

=== BIM ===
The company played a role in the early development of building information modelling, employing the developers of RUCAPS, the first 'building modelling' application (used for the King Saud University project), and from 1977 sold through GMW Computers Ltd in several countries worldwide. It was amongst the leading systems of its time, selling many hundreds of copies at a time when computer-aided design was rare and expensive. Jonathan Ingram, sometimes called the 'Father of BIM', worked on enhancing RUCAPS at GMW Computers in the early 1980s. Envisaging a better software, he quit working at GMW, got a bank loan so that he could purchase a workstation, and developed Sonata, released in 1986 and sold to GMW in 1987.

The term 'building model' (in the sense of BIM as used today) was first used in a 1986 paper by Robert Aish – then at GMW Computers – referring to the RUCAPS software's use at Heathrow Terminal 3, and it is regarded as a forerunner to today's BIM software.

== Current activities ==
By the time of its 2015 acquisition by Scott Brownrigg, GMW had become a transport specialist. It undertook work for Network Rail, had completed the passenger terminal at the Prince Mohammad bin Abdulaziz Airport in Medina, and continued to work on the completion of the Istanbul Airport (designed by Grimshaw Architects, Nordic Office of Architecture and Haptic). Following the acquisition, the practice ceased working under its own name.
