= Ecobuild =

UK construction exhibition

Ecobuild is a construction exhibition in the United Kingdom for the construction and energy market. It was first launched in 2005 as an event to appeal to those interested in sustainable design. According to their website, Ecobuild's primary tenets of construction are wellness, energy efficiency, infrastructure, technology, housing, and offsite construction. Ecobuild says it also focuses on productivity, welfare, and for the efficient use of energy. Ecobuild focuses on construction for both residential and commercial facilities. Ecobuild is a patron of environmental protection.

== Futurebuild ==
Ecobuild was renamed to Futurebuild in 2019 as part of a rebranding process after being acquired by Futurebuild Events Ltd from UBM in 2017. UBM reportedly decided to sell the Ecobuild show "following a review of its assets and partnerships."

== See also ==
- Energy efficiency in British housing
