= AutoCAD Architecture =

Architectural software by Autodesk

- Developer(s): Autodesk
- Initial release: February 1997; 28 years ago
- Stable release: 2024 (24.3) / March 2023; 2 years ago
- Operating system: Windows
- Type: CAD
- License: Proprietary
- Website: www.autodesk.com/products/autocad/included-toolsets/autocad-architecture

AutoCAD Architecture (abbreviated as ACA) is a version of Autodesk's flagship product, AutoCAD, with tools and functions specially suited to architectural work.

Architectural objects have a relationship to one another and interact with each other intelligently. For example, a window has a relationship to the wall that contains it. If you move or delete the wall, the window reacts accordingly. Objects can be represented in both 2D and 3D.

In addition, intelligent architectural objects maintain dynamic links with construction documents and specifications, resulting in more accurate project deliverables. When someone deletes or modifies a door, for example, the door schedule can be automatically updated. Spaces and areas update automatically when certain elements are changed, calculations such as square footage are always up to date.

AutoCAD Architecture uses the DWG file format but an object enabler is needed to access, display, and manipulate object data in applications different from AutoCAD Architecture.

AutoCAD Architecture was formerly known as AutoCAD Architectural Desktop (often abbreviated ADT) but Autodesk changed its name for the 2008 edition. The change was made to better match the names of Autodesk's other discipline-specific packages, such as AutoCAD Electrical and AutoCAD Mechanical.

As of AutoCAD 2019 all discipline-specific packages are included as Industry-Specific Toolsets with AutoCAD subscription but still as individual installers.

== Version history ==
Official name	Version	Release	Date of release	Comments
AutoCAD Architectural Desktop 1	14	1	1997, February	Platform: AutoCAD R14
AutoCAD Architectural Desktop 2	15.0	2	1998, July	Platform: AutoCAD 2000
AutoCAD Architectural Desktop 2i	15.1	(port only)	2000, July	Platform: AutoCAD 2000i
AutoCAD Architectural Desktop 3	15.1	3	2000, December	Platform: AutoCAD 2001
AutoCAD Architectural Desktop 3.3	15.6	(port only)	2001, June	Platform: AutoCAD 2002
Architectural Desktop 2004	16.0	4	2003, March	Platform: AutoCAD 2004
Architectural Desktop 2005	16.1	5	2004, April	Platform: AutoCAD 2005
Architectural Desktop 2006	16.2	6	2005, April	Platform: AutoCAD 2006
Architectural Desktop 2007	17.0	7	2006, April	Platform: AutoCAD 2007
AutoCAD Architecture 2008	17.1	8	2007, March	Platform: AutoCAD 2008
AutoCAD Architecture 2009	17.2	9	2008, March	Platform: AutoCAD 2009; first release available for the x86-64 windows version of XP and Vista.
AutoCAD Architecture 2010	18.0	10	2009, March	Platform: AutoCAD 2010
AutoCAD Architecture 2011	18.1	11	2010, March	Platform: AutoCAD 2011
AutoCAD Architecture 2012	18.2	12	2011, March 22	Platform: AutoCAD 2012
AutoCAD Architecture 2013	19.0	13	2012, March 27	Platform: AutoCAD 2013
AutoCAD Architecture 2014	19.1	14	2013, March 26	Platform: AutoCAD 2014
AutoCAD Architecture 2015	20.0	15	2014, March 27	Platform: AutoCAD 2015
AutoCAD Architecture 2016	20.1	16	2015, March 20	Platform: AutoCAD 2016
AutoCAD Architecture 2017	21.0	17	2016, March 30	Platform: AutoCAD 2017
AutoCAD Architecture 2018	22.0	18	2017, March	Platform: AutoCAD 2018
AutoCAD Architecture 2019	23.0	19	2018, March	Platform: AutoCAD 2019
AutoCAD Architecture 2020	23.1	20	2019, March	Platform: AutoCAD 2020
AutoCAD Architecture 2021	24.0	21	2020, March	Platform: AutoCAD 2021
AutoCAD Architecture 2022	24.1	22	2021, March	Platform: AutoCAD 2022
AutoCAD Architecture 2023	24.2	23	2022, March	Platform: AutoCAD 2023
AutoCAD Architecture 2024	24.3	24	2023, March	Platform: AutoCAD 2024

== See also ==
- Autodesk
- AutoCAD
- DWF
- DWG
- Comparison of CAD editors for architecture, engineering and construction (AEC)
