= Graphisoft =

Software company

Graphisoft SE

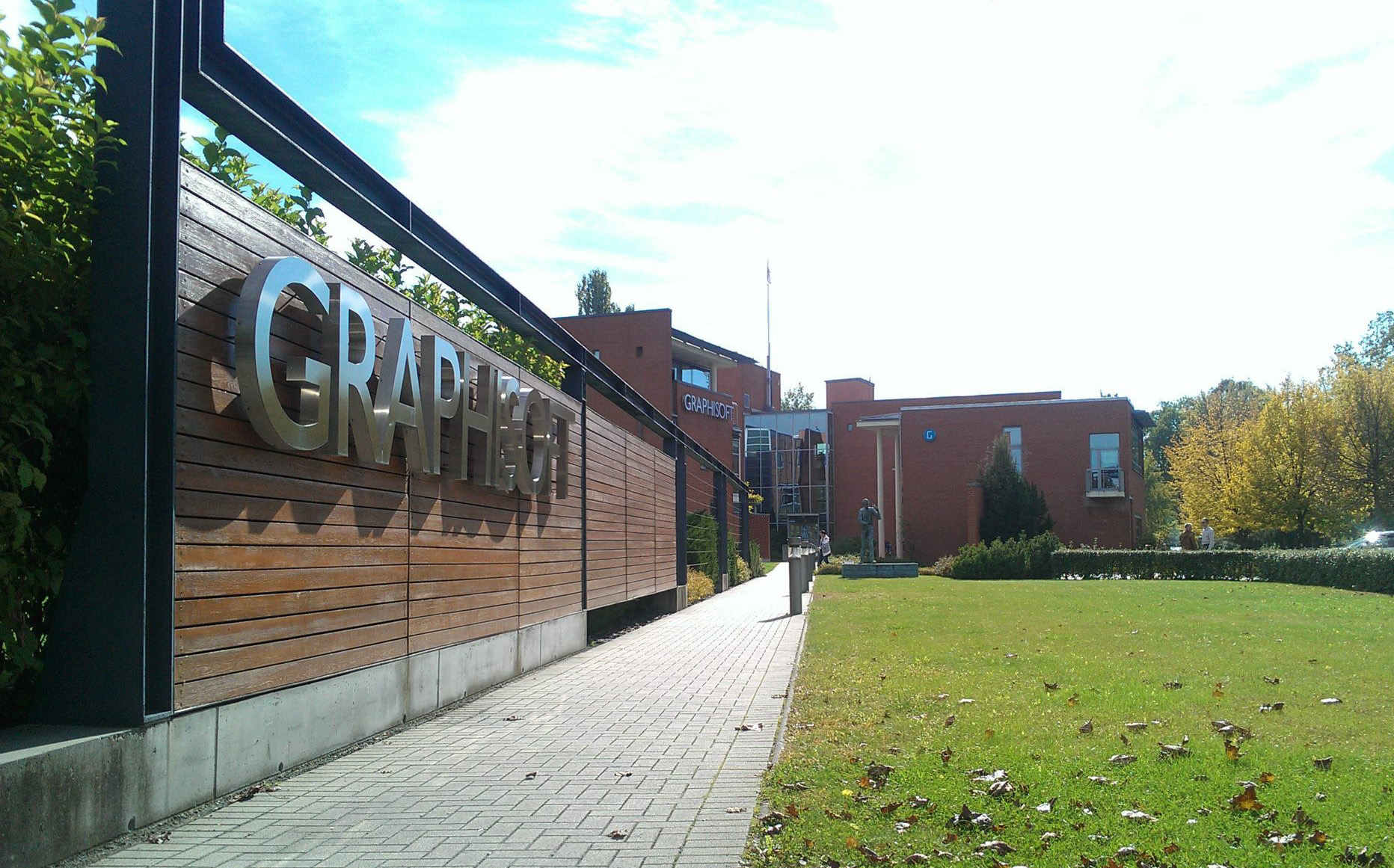
- Type: Societas Europaea
- Industry: Computer-aided design; Building Information Modeling; Software
- Founded: Budapest, Hungary (1982)
- Headquarters: Budapest, Hungary
- Key people: Gábor Bojár; (Founder); Daniel Csillag; (CEO)
- Products: See complete products listing.
- Parent: Nemetschek SE
- Subsidiaries: Graphisoft R&D Zrt.; Graphisoft Deutschland GmbH; Graphisoft North America Inc.; Graphisoft Japan Co. Ltd.; Graphisoft UK Ltd.; Graphisoft Brazil; Graphisoft Singapore; Graphisoft Hong Kong Ltd.; Graphisoft Beijing Rep. Office; Graphisoft Mexico; Graphisoft Italy; Graphisoft France; Graphisoft Switzerland
- Website: www.graphisoft.com

Graphisoft SE is a European multinational corporation that designs software, and is headquartered in Budapest, Hungary. As a subsidiary of Nemetschek, Graphisoft develops Building Information Modeling software products for architects, interior designers and planners. Graphisoft has subsidiaries in Germany, France, Switzerland, United States, United Kingdom, Spain, Japan and a representative office in Singapore. The company's flagship product is Archicad — an architectural design software developed since 1984 for Windows and Mac platforms.

== History ==
=== Foundation ===
In 1982, Graphisoft was established by Gábor Bojár. The Hungarian software developer created terrain modeling software on microcomputers while he was head of a mathematical department at the Geophysical Institute in Budapest. The communist history of Hungary was an important factor in the success of Graphisoft. When private companies had been allowed, Bojár promptly left his job and launched Graphisoft with a competent team. They were all experts in three-dimensional mathematical modeling but had no access to the most modern and efficient computers. This limitation led to the development of 3D modeling software that could be used on low-cost PCs. Then the team provided such software to architects. Since 1984, Graphisoft has been supported by Apple. Steve Jobs was impressed by Graphisoft's capability and the development of the architectural CAD from Bojár in the 2D/3D technology. Therefore, he sent them an Apple computer. This made it possible to create Archicad, the first desktop BIM system and Graphisoft's flagship product.

Graphisoft's flagship product, Archicad was introduced in 1987 as the Virtual Building concept, later (2003) regarded as building information modeling (BIM), and allowing architects to draw walls, windows, doors, slabs and roofs — a common feature now of every BIM-based architectural design software. Subsequent Archicad releases introduced other BIM features such as Teamwork, which enabled more architects to work on the same building in parallel, edit functions in three-dimensional model views, and interoperability add-ons to communicate with other applications using IFC — now a de facto standard in data exchange between BIM applications.

Graphisoft built a campus north of Budapest, Graphisoft Park. The construction of the technology park began in 1998. Today, it includes the company‘s global headquarters and hosts several technology companies such as Microsoft, SAP and Canon. Graphisoft was introduced to the Frankfurt Stock Exchange in 1998 and the Budapest Stock Exchange in 2000, and was purchased by Nemetschek AG (Germany) in 2007.

In 2013, Graphisoft signed a contract with Nikken Sekkei, to create the BIM Competence & Research Center in order to advance BIM in Japan and Southeast Asia. In 2016, Graphisoft partnered with the company Atlas Cloud to provide a cloud-based access to Archicad. In September 2018, Graphisoft Park expanded by 20,000 square-meters in the cause of its 20th anniversary, lifting the park's total area to 75,000sqm. The new buildings are rented to companies under lease. In addition, Graphisoft Park developed an advanced learning center, the Aquincum Institute of Technology (AIT-Budapest).

In April 2019, Graphisoft's CEO Viktor Várkonyi started to manage the Planning and Design Division at Graphisoft's mother company Nemetschek. Huw Roberts was appointed the new CEO of Graphisoft.

In June 2019, Graphisoft entered a partnership with Epic Games to launch next-generation real-time rendering solution for its customers.

Daniel Csillag was named CEO of Graphisoft in February 2024, succeeding Huw Roberts.

== Products ==
=== Graphisoft Archicad ===
Archicad is a complex architectural design tool offering 2D and 3D drafting, visualization and documentation functions for architects and planners to create three-dimensional designs and detailed technical documentation, thus enabling architects to use Archicad from the earliest design phases to the technical detail drawings. As of 2023 Archicad is in its 26th generation.

=== Graphisoft BIM Server ===
Graphisoft's second generation collaboration system lets more architects work on the same building simultaneously with Archicad by allowing them to access and manage the building information model database over the internet. Graphisoft BIM Server is shipped with Archicad from version 13.

Available in both private and public cloud configurations on standard hardware. BIMcloud SaaS allows fast, efficient, and secure access to shared projects in real time

=== Graphisoft MEP Modeler ===
Graphisoft MEP Modeler (Mechanical/Electrical/Plumbing) Modeler is an Archicad extension for architects to incorporate duct work and piping into the architectural design. MEP Modeler allows architects to create, edit or import 3D MEP networks and coordinate them with the Building Information Model, facilitating the BIM workflow between engineers and architects.

=== Graphisoft EcoDesigner ===
Graphisoft EcoDesigner helps architects to use virtual building information to evaluate energy performance, thus the sustainability of the building from the very first concept design. EcoDesigner allows architects to analyze their design for energy efficiency, providing feedback on the building's estimated energy performance.

=== Graphisoft BIMcloud ===
BIMcloud offers secure, real-time multi-disciplinary collaboration between all project team members regardless of the size or complexity of the project, the location of the offices, or the speed of the internet connection. Available in both private and public cloud configurations on standard hardware.

=== DDScad ===
Graphisoft merged with sister company DDScad in 2021 to add full MEP capabilities to Archicad.

DDScad solutions support users with intelligent Mechanical, Electrical, Plumbing (MEP) design tools, integrated calculations, and comprehensive documentation of all building systems.

=== Archicad Collaborate ===
Graphisoft announced Archicad Collaborate on March 21, 2023. The subscription-based offering combines Archicad with BIMcloud Software as a Service (SaaS) for the price of an Archicad subscription. “The included software, services, and cloud technology in Archicad Collaborate offer a compelling advantage over rival BIM solutions in the market where such items are often separated into additional to-purchase options.”

=== Graphisoft BIMx ===
BIMx, formerly marketed as Virtual Building Explorer is an interactive BIM model presentation tool, which allows the presentation of entire building models without the need for installing Archicad or other BIM authoring tool. The software combines video game-like navigation with native BIM features, including measurement of real building dimensions, model cut-throughs, and project markups.

== See also ==
- Drawbase Software
