= Trimble Inc. =

American technology company

- Formerly: Trimble Navigation Limited
- Type: Public
- Traded as: Nasdaq: TRMB; S&P 500 component
- Industry: Geospatial, Construction, Agriculture, Transportation and Logistics, Telematics, Asset tracking, Mapping, Utilities, Mobile Resource Management, Government
- Founded: November 1978; 47 years ago
- Founder: Charles Trimble et al.
- Headquarters: Westminster, Colorado, U.S.
- Key people: Börje Ekholm (chairman); Robert Painter (CEO); Phil Sawarynski (CFO)
- Revenue: ▼US$3.59 billion (2025)
- Operating income: ▲US$592 million (2025)
- Net income: ▼US$424 million (2025)
- Total assets: ▼US$9.31 billion (2025)
- Total equity: ▲US$5.84 billion (2025)
- Number of employees: 11,500 (2025)
- Website: trimble.com

Trimble Inc. is an American software, hardware, and services technology company that was founded in 1978. Its headquarters is in Westminster, Colorado. It is publicly traded on the Nasdaq and listed on the S&P 500. Trimble develops hardware and software for a variety of business sectors including architecture, engineering, and construction (AEC); surveying, mapping, and geomatics (geospatial); and transportation and logistics (T&L).

== History ==
=== 1978–1998 ===
Trimble Inc. was founded as Trimble Navigation in November 1978 by Charles Trimble and two engineers from Hewlett-Packard. The company originally operated out of Los Altos, California.

One of the company's first moves was to acquire the rights to a Loran-C navigation technology that Hewlett-Packard had stopped developing. Trimble bought the technology for $50,000. By 1982, Trimble was selling approximately $1 million of Loran equipment per year. In the mid-1980s, Trimble began to move into the GPS technology space. For example, in 1985, the company introduced GPS tech that could be used for offshore drilling surveying as well as GPS navigation tools for aircraft. In 1986, Trimble moved its headquarters from Los Altos to Sunnyvale, California.

Trimble held its initial public offering in 1990. That same year, Trimble began selling GPS-enabled personal position finders to the U.S. military. Following the Iraqi invasion of Kuwait, U.S. military demand for these finders increased significantly and Trimble's sales revenues grew from approximately $5 million per month to $19 million per month. In 1991, the company had about 750 employees.

In the early 1990s, Trimble began developing real-time kinematic positioning (RTK) tools for surveying. The company's first commercially available RTK product, called the Site Surveyor System, was released in 1993. The following March, Trimble released its first RTK receiver with on-the-fly capabilities.

In 1995, Trimble began working with Caterpillar to develop global navigation satellite system (GNSS) receivers for heavy construction vehicles. The first product of this partnership was a blade-mounted GNSS tool for bulldozers.

=== 1998–2019 ===
In 1998, Charles Trimble left the company. Steve Berglund, who was previously president of Spectra Precision, took over as CEO in 1999. In May 2000, Trimble announced that it was acquiring Spectra Precision. The acquisition allowed Trimble to integrate Spectra's software development team and virtual reference station technology into its business.

In 2002, Caterpillar and Trimble formed a joint venture, Caterpillar Trimble Control Technologies (CTCT), to develop machine control systems for construction equipment. By 2003, Trimble had started selling a combination GPS and laser grade control system for earthworks equipment, to help farmers level land and control water drainage. By March 2004, Trimble had acquired and integrated the staff and technology of the 3D laser scanning company MENSI. Between 1999 and 2007, Trimble's annual revenues grew from $270 million to approximately $1 billion. By 2008, it employed approximately 3,400 people in 18 countries.

In May 2011, Trimble announced that it would be acquiring Tekla, a Finnish firm specializing in building information modeling (BIM) software. The acquisition was completed later that year. The following January, Trimble announced that it would purchase StruCad and StruEngineer from AceCad Software in order to expand the capabilities of Tekla's BIM software. Trimble acquired the 3D modeling software package SketchUp from Google in 2012 and acquired TMW Systems the same year. In 2016, Trimble further built out its design-build-operate portfolio by acquiring the building design software company Sefaira. In April 2018, Trimble agreed to acquire the construction software company Viewpoint from investment firm Bain Capital in an all-cash $1.2 billion transaction.

=== 2019–present ===
In October 2019, Trimble announced that Robert G. Painter would become the company's president and CEO, effective January 4, 2020. In November 2020, the firm signed an agreement with Boston Dynamics to integrate construction data collection technologies into BD's robotic dog Spot. In December 2021, Trimble purchased AgileAssets, a SaaS company helping corporate and governmental clients manage infrastructure assets. AgileAssets was absorbed into the buildings and infrastructure segment of Trimble's business.

In September 2022, Trimble acquired B2W Software, a New Hampshire-based developer of software for the heavy civil construction industry. The following month, Trimble announced its headquarters had relocated to Westminster, Colorado from Sunnyvale, California. In December 2022, Trimble acquired the transportation management platform Transporeon in order to strengthen its existing transportation management systems offerings.

In September 2023, AGCO announced that it would acquire an 85% stake in Trimble's agriculture business. This acquisition created a new joint venture called PTx Trimble.

In March 2024, Trimble joined the Alliance of OpenUSD. That same month, the company announced that it would be partnering with Nvidia to provide model data for Nvidia Omniverse RTX viewers. In May 2024, Trimble acquired Flashtract, a company specializing in payment, compliance, and documentation exchange. Trimble subsequently rebranded Flashtract's technology as Trimble Pay. In September 2024, Trimble announced that it would be selling its transportation telematics business to Platform Science in exchange for a 32.5% stake in Platform Science.

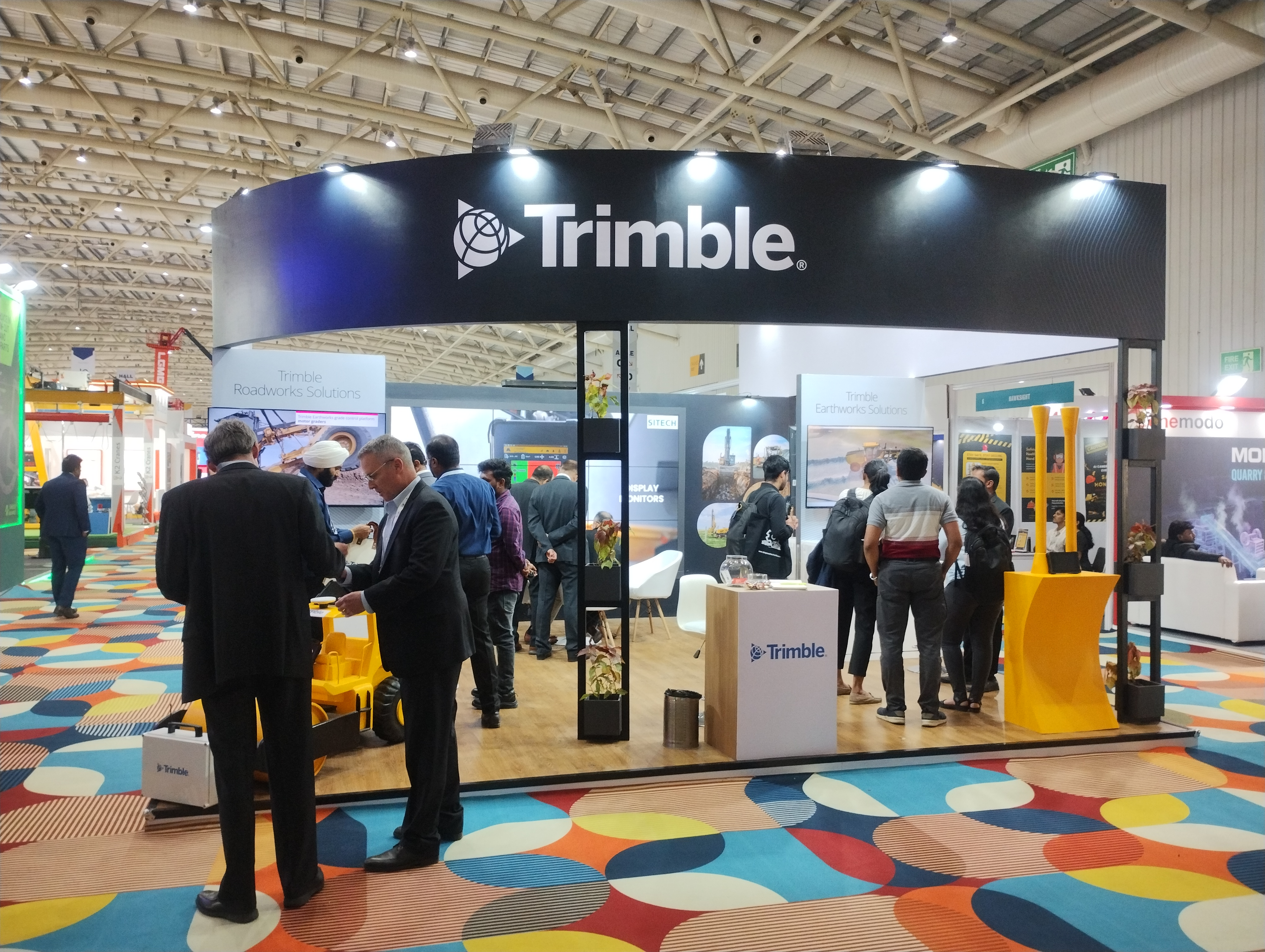
Trimble Inc. at EXCON 2025, BIEC

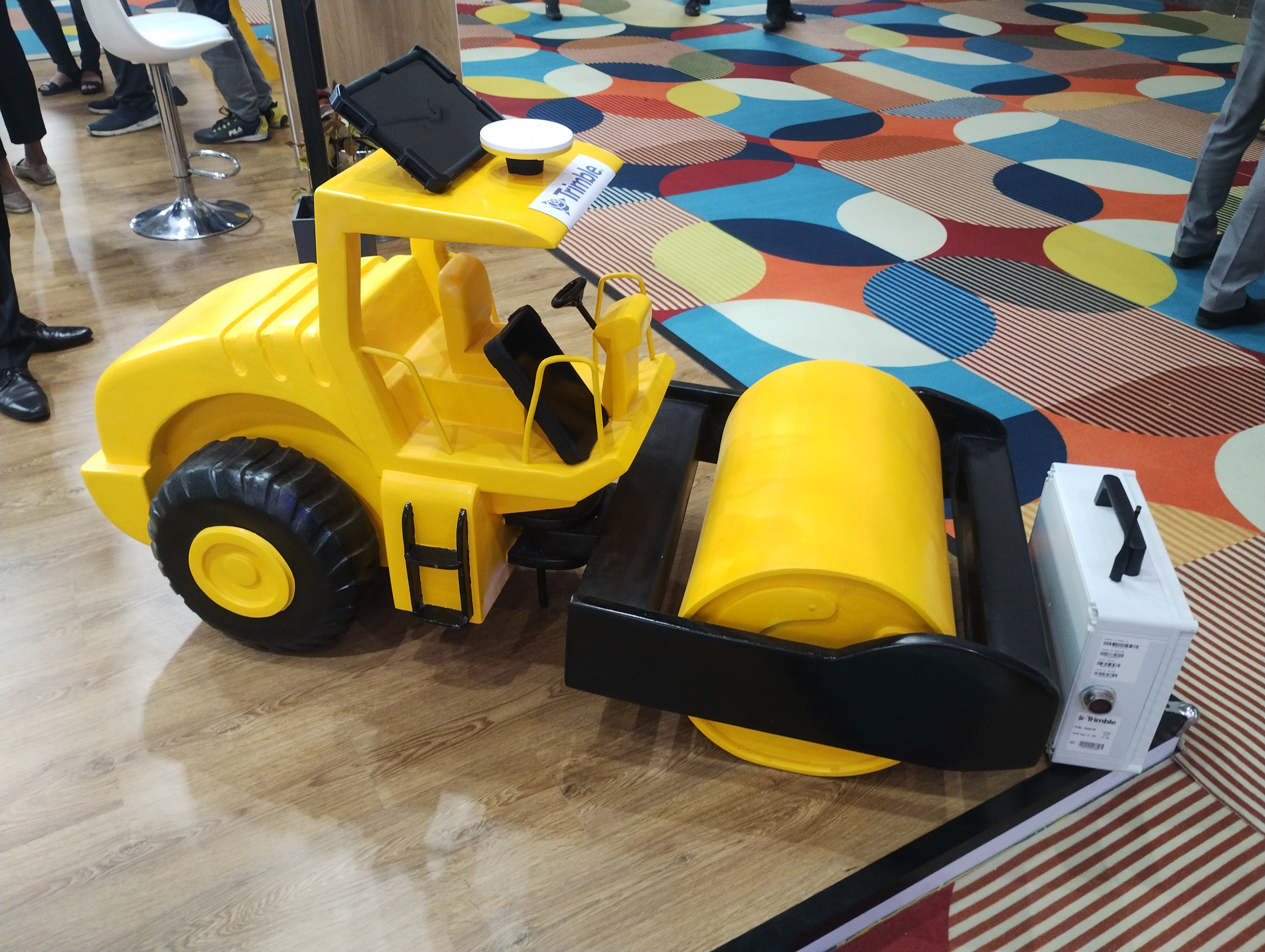
Trimble's construction vehicle model at EXCON 2025, BIEC

== Products and services ==
Trimble develops hardware and software used by field and office personnel for workflow and asset management. The company integrates sensors, software, hardware, and data, including utilizing cloud computing and artificial intelligence, to improve worker collaboration and simplify industrial projects.

The company reports that its products focus on three segments.

- Architects, Engineers, Construction and Owners (AECO): software products used for design, engineering, building and civil construction, capital planning, and asset management.
- Field Systems: products for surveying and mapping professionals, civil construction, building construction field services, and positioning systems.
- Transportation and Logistics (T&L): products for shippers, carriers, and intermediaries, including the truckload freight market.
