= Virtual design and construction =

Virtual design and construction (VDC) is the management of integrated multi-disciplinary performance models of design–construction projects, including the product (facilities), work processes, and organization of the design – construction – operation team to support explicit and public business objectives. This is usually achieved creating a digital twin of the project, in where to manage the information.

The theoretical basis of VDC includes:

- Engineering modeling methods: product, organization, process
- Analysis methods – model-based design: including quantities, schedule, cost, 4D interactions, and process risks, these are termed building information modeling (BIM) tools
- Visualization methods
- Business metrics – within business analytics – and a focus on strategic management
- Economic impact analysis, i.e., models of both the cost and value of capital investments

== BIM (Building Information Modeling) managed project ==
"Virtual design and construction BIMs (Building Information Modeling) are virtual because they show computer-based descriptions of the project. The BIM project model emphasizes those aspects of the project that can be designed and managed, i.e., the product (typically a building or plant [and infrastructure]), the organization that will define, design, construct, and operate it, and the process the organization teams will follow, that is, the product–organization–process or POP. These models are logically integrated in the sense that they all can access shared data, and if a user highlights or changes an aspect of one, the integrated models can highlight or change the dependent aspects of related models. The models are multi-disciplinary in the sense that they represent the architect, engineering, construction (AEC), and owner of the project, as well as relevant sub-disciplines. The models are performance models in the sense that they predict some aspects of project performance, track many that are relevant, and can show predicted and measured performance in relationship to stated project performance objectives. Some companies now practice the first steps of BIM modeling, and they consistently find that they improve business performance by doing so." Companies are also now considering developing BIMs in various levels of detail, since depending on the application of BIM, more or less detail is needed, and there is varying modeling effort associated with generating building information models at different levels of detail.

== Methodologies underpinning BIM ==
Advances in construction engineering began with the ten volumes on architecture completed by Vitruvi, a 1st century B.C. Roman. Vitruvius laid the key and lasting foundation for a study of construction.

A principle of construction is a use of an applied ontology based in the upper ontology. In practice, these ontologies take on a form of breakdown structures such as the work breakdown structure. Usually breakdown structures form metadata to represent a construction activity; there are notable cases at exceptionally large construction companies where they are simply numbered. In practice, an ontology approach requires a semantic integration approach to construction data so to capture a present status of construction activities (i.e., the project).

The research that forms virtual design and construction (VDC) is based in scientific evidence and a validation measured against a best theory opposed to a best practice. This approach, pioneered by the illustrious Dr. Kunz, was a departure from earlier construction engineering methodologies that focused on studies of best practices. The scientific evidence method requires formulating a hypothesis and then testing that hypothesis to failure so to validate. A range of scientific methodologies have proven useful in construction engineering research, in both qualitative research and quantitative research. Because construction is difficult to replicate in a controlled setting, the case-based reasoning, case study and action research methodologies prevail. Power of a method is important to include in results; the case study is often broad and the action research is often focused.

A core concept in VDC is spacetime dimensions. There are four dimensions; three space dimensions and a fourth, time. There are additional dimensions of cost and quality, but a core is formed by these four. The four dimensions were first understood by Vitruvi as an importance of perspective (i.e., 3D) and time (i.e., 4D). Prior to computing, a focus was on the fourth dimension of time. In practice, time is a focus of the critical path method. With advances in computing, the representation of three dimensions of space has increased. The merging of space and the above discussed ontology formed the information model, in the construction engineering field, known as building information modeling. The combination of space and time in practice is shown by the linear scheduling method and in close relation the 4D model.

Computing brought about the advent of the need to align with a software developer. Previously, pencil and paper was forgiving on the mixing of methods from different schools of thought. Software is not as forgiving and to mix software requires this as a goal. This forms the field of interoperability research. The practical application is demonstrated by the Industry Foundation Classes.

Today, the most compelling advances in VDC are in computer vision (List of computer vision topics), artificial intelligence, and the architecture of transmission (AoT), an object-oriented project lifecycle management process, which acts as a counterpoint to commissioned IoT technologies.

An important application of VDC is in the workzone. This is where the construction activities reside, and the workforce is a core component. To create an educated workforce with the technical know-how to use the technology tools now available, VDC includes the development of advanced vocational education topics.

== See also ==
- Construction management
- Construction engineering
- List of project management topics

== Research centers ==
- Center for Integrated Facility Engineering (CIFE), Stanford University
- mosaic, Carnegie Mellon University
- BIM at UTexas
- Field Systems and Construction Automation Laboratory (FSCAL), UTexas
- Construction Information Technology Laboratory (CITL), Georgia Institute of Technology
- RAPIDS Laboratory, Georgia Institute of Technology
