= Archicad =

Computer-aided design software for architecture

- A 3D render designed in Archicad, 2007
- Developer: Graphisoft
- Stable release: 30 / October 7, 2026; 2 days ago
- Operating system: Windows, macOS
- Type: Building information modeling, CAD
- License: Proprietary
- Website: www.graphisoft.com/plans-and-products/archicad

Archicad is an architectural building information modeling (BIM) computer-aided design (CAD) software for Mac and Windows developed by the Hungarian company Graphisoft.

== History ==
Development of Archicad began in 1982 for the Apple Lisa, the predecessor of the original Apple Macintosh. Following its launch in 1987, with Graphisoft's "Virtual Building" concept, Archicad became regarded by some as the first implementation of BIM. However, Archicad founder Gábor Bojár has acknowledged to Jonathan Ingram in an open letter that Sonata "was more advanced in 1986 than Archicad at that time", adding that it "surpassed already the matured definition of 'BIM' specified only about one and a half decade later". Archicad has been recognized as the first CAD product on a personal computer able to create both 2D and 3D geometry, as well as the first commercial BIM product for personal computers and considered "revolutionary" for the ability to store large amounts of information within the 3D model.

== Product overview ==
Archicad is a complete design suite with 2D and 3D drafting, visualization and other building information modeling functions for architects, designers and planners. A wide range of software applications are integrated in Archicad to cover most of the design needs of an architectural office:

- 2D modeling CAD software – drawing tools for creating accurate and detailed technical drawings
- 3D Modeling software – a 3D CAD interface specially developed for architects capable of creating various kind of building forms
- Architectural rendering and Visualization software – a high performance rendering tool to produce photo-realistic pictures or videos
- Desktop publishing software – with similar features to mainstream DTP software to compose printed materials using technical drawings pixel-based images and texts
- Document management tool – a central data storage server with remote access, versioning tool with backup and restore features
- Building information modeling software – not just a collection of the above-mentioned applications with an integrated user interface but a novel approach to building design called BIM

== Features ==
=== Using parametric objects ===
Archicad allows the user to work with data-enhanced parametric objects, often called smart objects by users. This differs from the operational style of other CAD programs created in the 1980s. The product allows the user to create a virtual building with virtual structural elements like walls, slabs, roofs, doors, windows and furniture. A large variety of pre-designed, customizable objects come with the program.

Archicad software offers the flexibility to work with a 2D or 3D representation on the screen. Although the program's database stores data in three dimensions, 2D drawings can be exported at any time. Plans, elevations, and sections are generated from the 3D virtual building model and can be updated constantly by rebuilding the view. Detail drawings are based on enlarged portions of the model, with 2D detail added in.

=== Collaboration and remote access ===
Archicad released its first file exchange based Teamwork solution in its version 5.1 in 1997, which allowed more architects to work on the same building model simultaneously. A fully rewritten Teamwork 2.0 solution with a new database approach came out in version 13 in 2009 named Graphisoft BIM Server. Since only the changes and differences are sent to the central storage, this system allows remote access to the same project over the Internet, thus allowing worldwide project collaboration and coordination. In 2014, with the introduction of the BIMcloud, better integration is provided with standard IT solutions: browser-based management, LDAP connection, and HTTP/HTTPS based communication. Also, new scalability options are available, by allowing multi-server layouts to be created, with optional caching servers.

=== APIs and scripting ===
Third-party vendors and some manufacturers of architectural products have compiled libraries of architectural components for use in Archicad. The program includes Geometric Description Language (GDL) used to create new components. Also, API (Application Programming Interface) and ODBC database connections are supported for third party Add-On developers. Via direct API links to 4D and 5D software such as Vico Office Suite or Tocoman iLink, the Archicad model can be exported to BIM-based cost estimation and scheduling. Archicad is also directly linked via API to Solibri's Model checking and quality assurance tools.

In addition, Graphisoft provides a direct link to Grasshopper 3D enabling a visual programming environment for parametric modelling and design.

=== Data interchange ===
Archicad can import and export DWG, DXF, Industry Foundation Classes (IFC) and BIM Collaboration Format (BCF) files among others. Graphisoft is an active member of BuildingSMART (formerly the International Alliance for Interoperability, IAI), an industry organization that publishes standards for file and data interoperability for built environment software. Graphisoft was one of the founders of the Open BIM concept, which supports 3D BIM data exchange between the different design disciplines on open-source platforms.

Archicad can also export the 3D model and its corresponding 2D drawings to BIMx format which can be viewed on several desktop and mobile platforms with native BIMx viewers.

== License types and localizations ==
=== License types ===
Commercial, educational and fully functional 30-day trial versions can be installed with the same installer. As long as no hardware protection is present or the software is not activated with a trial or an educational serial number, Archicad can be launched in demo mode. The installer files can not be downloaded without registration. The educational or trial serial numbers can be obtained after registration.

- Commercial version is protected by either a hardware protection key or a software key. If no key is present, Archicad switches to Demo mode where Save, Copy and Teamwork features are disabled (printing/plotting is still enabled, even in case the project file has been modified since opening).
- START Edition is a streamlined version of Archicad for smaller practices or offices who don't need collaboration and advanced rendering functionality.
- Educational versions are protected by serial numbers. Saved files in Archicad educational versions are compatible with commercial Archicad versions, but carry a watermark identifying the license type. Once a project has been edited with an Educational version, the watermark will persist in the file.
- Trial version is a 30-day fully functional version in which you can save, print and publish projects. File formats are fully compatible with the commercial version once the copy of Archicad is used with a commercial license. Otherwise the files created by a trial version are only readable by the same Archicad instance with which they were created. The trial version is protected by a serial number.

=== Languages and localizations ===
Archicad is available in many localized versions. In addition to a translated user interface and documentation, these versions have a set of parametric objects (object libraries) developed considering the specific requirements of the regional market, and different default values for object properties, menu arrangements, etc.

- Australian (AUS)
- Austrian (AUT)
- Brazilian Portuguese (BRA)
- Czech (CZE)
- Danish (DEN)
- Dutch (NED)
- Finnish (FIN)
- French (FRA)
- German (GER)
- Greek (GRE)
- Hungarian (HUN)
- International (INT) (metric)
- Italian (ITA)
- Japanese (JPN)
- Korean (KOR)
- Mexico (MEX)
- New Zealand (NZE)
- Norwegian (NOR)
- Polish (POL)
- Portuguese (POR)
- Russian (RUS)
- Simplified Chinese (CHI)
- Spanish (SPA)
- Swedish (SWE)
- Swiss (CHE)
- Traditional Chinese (TAI)
- Turkish (TUR)
- Ukrainian (UKR)
- United Kingdom & Ireland (UKI)
- US (USA) (imperial)

== Extensions ==
Various free and commercial add-on products and extensions add extra functionality to Archicad or provide further data exchange possibilities with other software applications. Some of these extensions are developed by Graphisoft, such as the freely available Trimble SketchUp, Google Earth or Maxon's Cinema 4D import/export add-ons or other extensions sold separately such as Graphisoft MEP Modeler, Graphisoft EcoDesigner or Graphisoft Virtual Building Explorer; while there are several add-ons provided by third-party vendors, such as Cigraph or Cadimage.

== Version history ==
For a detailed version history see the help center article.

- 1984 - Radar CH (Archicad 1.0)
- 1986 – 2.0
- 1987 – 3.0
- 1988 – 3.1
- 1991 – 4.0
- 1992 – 4.1
- 1993 – 4.16
- 1994 – 4.5
- 1995 – 4.55
- 1996 – 5.0
- 1997 – 5.1
- 1998 – 6.0
- 1999 – 6.5
- 2001 – 7.0
- 2002 – 8
- 2003 – 8.1
- 2004 – 9
- 2006 – 10
- 2007 – 11
- 2008 – 12
- 2009 – 13
- 2010 – 14
- 2011 – 15
- 2012 – 16
- 2013 – 17
- 2014 – 18
- 2015 – 19
- 2016 – 20
- 2017 – 21
- 2018 – 22
- 2019 – 23
- 2020 – 24
- 2021 – 25
- 2022 – 26
- 2023 – 27
- 2024 – 28
- 2025 – 29
- 2026 – 30

== See also ==
- Autodesk Revit – Competing BIM software
- List of BIM software
