= Autodesk Revit =

Building information modeling software

Revit
- Developer: Autodesk
- Release: April 5, 2000
- Stable release: 2026 (v2026.3) / September 2025
- Operating system: 64-bit Windows
- Type: CAD building information modeling
- License: Proprietary
- Website: www.autodesk.com/products/revit/overview

Autodesk Revit is a building information modeling software for architects, structural engineers, mechanical, electrical, and plumbing (MEP) engineers and contractors. The original software was developed by Charles River Software, founded in 1997, renamed Revit Technology Corporation in 2000 and acquired by Autodesk in 2002. The software allows users to design a building and structure and its components in 3D Modeling, annotate the model with 2D drafting elements and access building information from the building model's database. Revit is 4D building information modeling (BIM) application capable with tools to plan and track various stages in the building's lifecycle, from concept to construction and later maintenance and/or demolition.

== Company history ==
Charles River Software was founded in Newton, Massachusetts, on October 31, 1997, by Leonid Raiz and Irwin Jungreis, key developers of PTC's Pro/Engineer software for mechanical design, with the intent of adapting parametric modeling - previously used in mechanical CAD - to the building industry (PTC had previously tried and failed to market its recently acquired Reflex software to the construction sector). With funding from venture capitalists Atlas Venture and North Bridge Venture Partners, Raiz and Jungreis hired several software developers and architects and began developing Revit in C++ on the Microsoft Windows platform. In 1999 they hired Dave Lemont as CEO and recruited board members Jon Hirschtick, founder of SolidWorks and Arol Wolford, founder of CMD Group.

The company was renamed Revit Technology Corporation in January 2000. Autodesk, best known for its AutoCAD line of products, purchased Revit Technology Corporation for US $133 million in 2002. The purchase allowed more research, development and improvement of the software.

Autodesk, through its Revit platform, operates in the BIM market alongside Tekla Structures, Trimble, Bentley Systems and the Nemetschek group. The Nemetschek group includes Graphisoft's ArchiCAD, as well as Allplan and Vectorworks.

== Product history ==
=== Inception ===
From the outset, Revit was intended to allow architects and other building professionals to design and document a building by creating a parametric three-dimensional model that included both the geometry and non-geometric design and construction information, which is also known as building information modeling or BIM (1975 Eastman C.). At the time, several other software packages—such as ArchiCAD and Reflex—provided a three-dimensional virtual building model and let the user control individual components via parameters (parametric components). Two key differences in Revit were that users created parametric components in a graphical "family editor" rather than a programming language. The model captured relationships between components, views, and annotations, allowing any change to automatically propagate to keep the model consistent. For example, moving a wall updated neighboring walls, floors and roofs, corrected the placement and values of dimensions and notes, adjusted the floor areas reported in schedules, redrew section views, etc.—so that the model remained connected and all documentation was coordinated. The concept of bi-directional associativity between components, views and annotations was a distinguishing feature of Revit for many releases. The ease of making changes inspired the name Revit, a contraction of Revise-Instantly. At the heart of Revit is a parametric change propagation engine that relied on a new technology, context-driven parametrics, that was more scalable than the variational and history-driven parametrics used in mechanical CAD software. The term parametric building model was adopted to reflect the fact that changes to parameters drove the whole building model and associated documentation, not just individual components.

=== Version 1.0 and beyond ===
Revit version 1.0 was released on April 5, 2000. The software progressed rapidly, with version 2.0, 3.0, 3.1, 4.0 and 4.1 released in August 2000; October 2000; February 2001; June 2001; November 2001; and January 2002, respectively.

The software was initially offered only as a monthly rental, with no option to purchase. Licensing was controlled by an entirely automatic process, an innovation at a time when human intervention and manual transmission of authorization codes was required to buy other types of design software.

Autodesk released several versions of Revit after 2004. In 2005 Revit Structure was introduced, then in 2006 Revit MEP. After the 2006 release Revit Building was renamed Revit Architecture.

In 2011 Dynamo was released in beta form allowing first glimpses of directly programming the behavior of hosted components through a drag and drop node interface. This is similar to the way the visual programming language Grasshopper 3d works on objects in Rhinoceros 3D.

In 2012 Revit LT became the newest version of Revit on the market. It was a feature limited or Lite version of Revit which excluded features such as rendering and multi-user environments. In 2013, Autodesk began introducing rental licensing for some of its products, including Revit.

Since Revit 2013 the different disciplines have been rolled into one product, simply called Revit.

Autodesk sells several packages or 'industry collections'; Revit is included in the AEC Collection.

Revit is available in multiple language localizations: English, German, French, Spanish, Portuguese, Italian, Russian, Polish, Czech, Chinese, Japanese and Korean.

With the release of Revit 2016, Autodesk dropped support for 32-bit Windows.

== Features ==
=== Modeling ===
The Revit work environment allows users to manipulate whole buildings or assemblies (in the project environment) or individual 3D shapes (in the family editor environment). Modeling tools can be used with pre-made solid objects or imported geometric models. However, Revit is not a NURBS modeller and also lacks the ability to manipulate an object's individual polygons except on some specific object types such as roofs, slabs and terrain or in the massing environment.

Revit includes categories of objects ("families" in Revit terminology). These fall into three groups:

- System families, such as walls, floors, roofs, ceilings, major finishes and even furniture built inside a project
- Loadable families/components, which are built with primitives (extrusions, sweeps, etc.) separately from the project and loaded into a project for use
- In-place families, which are built in-situ within a project with the same toolset as loadable components

An experienced user can create realistic and accurate families ranging from furniture to lighting fixtures, as well as import existing models from other programs. Revit families can be created as parametric models with dimensions and properties. This lets users modify a given component by changing predefined parameters such as height, width or number in the case of an array. In this way a family defines a geometry that is controlled by parameters, each combination of parameters can be saved as a type, and each occurrence (instance in Revit) of a type can also contain further variations. For example, a swing door may be a Family. It may have types that describe different sizes and the actual building model has instances of those types placed in walls where instance-based parameters could specify the door hardware uniquely for each occurrence of the door.

Although Revit software comes with a range of families out of the box (OOTB), they are limited, so users may find a need to build their own families or buy them from online stores.

Because of copyright issues in project work, fully 3D-modeled Revit project models are rarely for sale. Indeed, as most projects are site-specific and bespoke, the demand for existing models is light anyway. However, new practices or students of Revit may want to refer to completed models. There are a few sources for these, including websites such as BIMGallery and GrabCad.

=== Multiuser collaboration ===
Since version 3.0 Revit enables multiple users to work on the same building model. The workflow is similar to the use of a version control system in software engineering, that allows multiple developers to reliably collaborate on a common code base. Each Revit user works on a local copy of the design, periodically checking in the work into the central repository. New user starts with creating a local copy of this repository. When a user starts modifying some building elements, these elements get automatically locked, preventing others from modifying them. The locks are maintained in the central repository. The elements stay locked until the "borrower" checks in her work and releases the locks. Patented technology called "worksharing" allows Revit to minimize the set of elements being locked while allowing change propagation engine to update as many elements as needed, including the elements that are not locked. Revit typically avoids merge conflicts during check-in.

In early Revit versions the central repository has been a folder on LAN. This option is still available and appropriate for co-located design team. Since 2013 Autodesk also offers hosted cloud-based central repositories for Revit as a service.

=== Rendering ===
When a user creates a building, model or any other kind of object in Revit, they may use Revit's rendering engine to make a more realistic image of what is otherwise a very diagrammatic model. The user accomplishes this either by using the premade model, wall, floor, etc., tools, or making their own models, walls, materials, etc. Since Revit's 2010 release, the software came with a plethora of predefined materials, each of which can be modified to the user's desires. The user can also begin with a "Generic" material. With this, the user can set the rotation, size, brightness and intensity of textures, gloss maps (also known as shine maps), transparency maps, reflection maps, oblique reflection maps, hole maps and bump maps, as well as leaving the map part out and just using the sliders for any one (or all or none) of the aforementioned features of textures.

Cloud-based rendering with the experimental plug-in dubbed Project Neon, located on Autodesk Labs is in the beta phases and allows for the user to render their images through their Autodesk account instead of locally through their own computers. Revit models may also be linked directly into Autodesk 3ds Max (release 2013 and later) for more advanced rendering and animation projects with much of their material and object information maintained.

== See also ==
- Comparison of computer-aided design software
- Industry Foundation Classes
- List of BIM software
- Virtual design and construction
