= Tekla =

Finnish software company

Tekla Corporation
- Type: Limited company (Osakeyhtiö)
- Industry: Computer software
- Genre: Informatic
- Founded: 1966
- Founder: Reino Heinonen
- Fate: Acquired by Trimble Navigation
- Headquarters: Espoo, Finland
- Area served: Worldwide
- Products: Software CAD, CAE, BIM
- Services: Informatic
- Operating income: 10 million euro
- Net income: 57.8 million euro
- Number of employees: 500 (2011)
- Divisions: Informatic
- Website: www.tekla.com

Tekla is a software product family that consists of programs for analysis and design, detailing and project communication. Tekla software is produced by Trimble, the publicly listed US-based technology company.

== History ==
Between 1966 and 2015, Tekla Corporation was a software engineering company specialised in model-based software products for building, construction and infrastructure management. The company was listed on the Helsinki Stock Exchange from May 2000 until February 2012.

The name Tekla is a given name, used in the Nordic countries, in Poland and in Georgia. However, in this case it is an abbreviation of the Finnish words Teknillinen laskenta, which means technical computation.

In May 2011, California-based business technology specialist Trimble Navigation announced a public tender offer to acquire Tekla for $450 million. The acquisition was completed in February 2012.

In November 2013, Trimble acquired CSC, a UK-based engineering software company and Tekla's former business partner. This added Fastrack, Orion, and Tedds to their software portfolio. In November 2013, CSC was formally merged with Tekla.

In January 2016, Tekla Corporation as an organization changed its name to Trimble.

== Software ==
Tekla engineering software has been around since the late 1960s.

Tekla Structures is 3D building information modeling (BIM) software used in the building and construction industries for steel and concrete detailing, precast and cast in-situ. The software enables users to create and manage 3D structural models in concrete or steel, and guides them through the process from concept to fabrication. The process of shop drawing creation is automated. Along with the creation of CNC-files, files for controlling reinforcement bending machines, controlling precast concrete manufacturing, importing in PLM-systems etc. Tekla Structures is available in different configurations and localised environments to suit different segment- and culture-specific needs.

Tekla Structural Designer is software for analysis and design concrete and steel buildings.

Tekla Tedds is an application for automating repetitive structural and civil calculations. The software is used in engineering for creating output such as calculations, sketches and notes.

Tekla BIMsight is a software application for building information model-based construction project collaboration. It can import models from other BIM applications using the Industry Foundation Classes (IFC) format, also DWG and DGN. With Tekla BIMsight, users can perform spatial co-ordination (clash or conflict checking) to avoid design and constructability issues, and communicate with others in their construction project by sharing models and notes.

== See also ==
- Comparison of CAD editors for CAE
