= DSTV NC =

Format specified by Deutscher Stahlbau-Verband

STEP
- Filename extension: .nc, .nc1
- Developed by: DSTV
- Latest release: 9 November 2006; 20 years ago
- Website: Version 9 XML Specification

DSTV-NC is a data exchange format developed by the German Steel Construction Association (Deutsche Stahlbau-Verband) for product data that is designed to work with numeric control machines such as beamlines. It can represent many operations on parts, including drilling, tapping, cuts, marking, in a standardised format.

Software such as Autodesk's Advance Steel and Trimble's Tekla Structures can produce NC files that match the specification.
