= Drafter =

Person who makes technical drawings

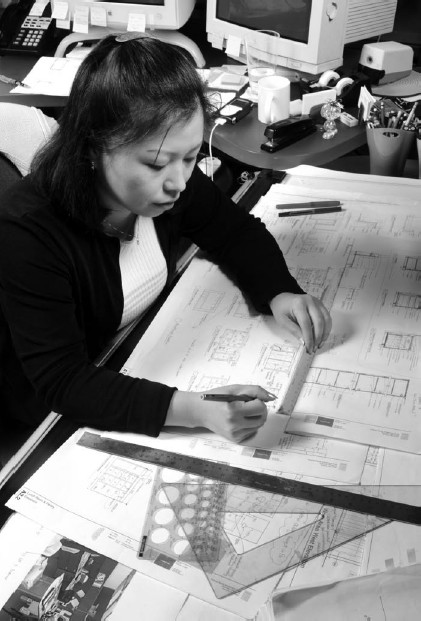
Traditional drafter at work

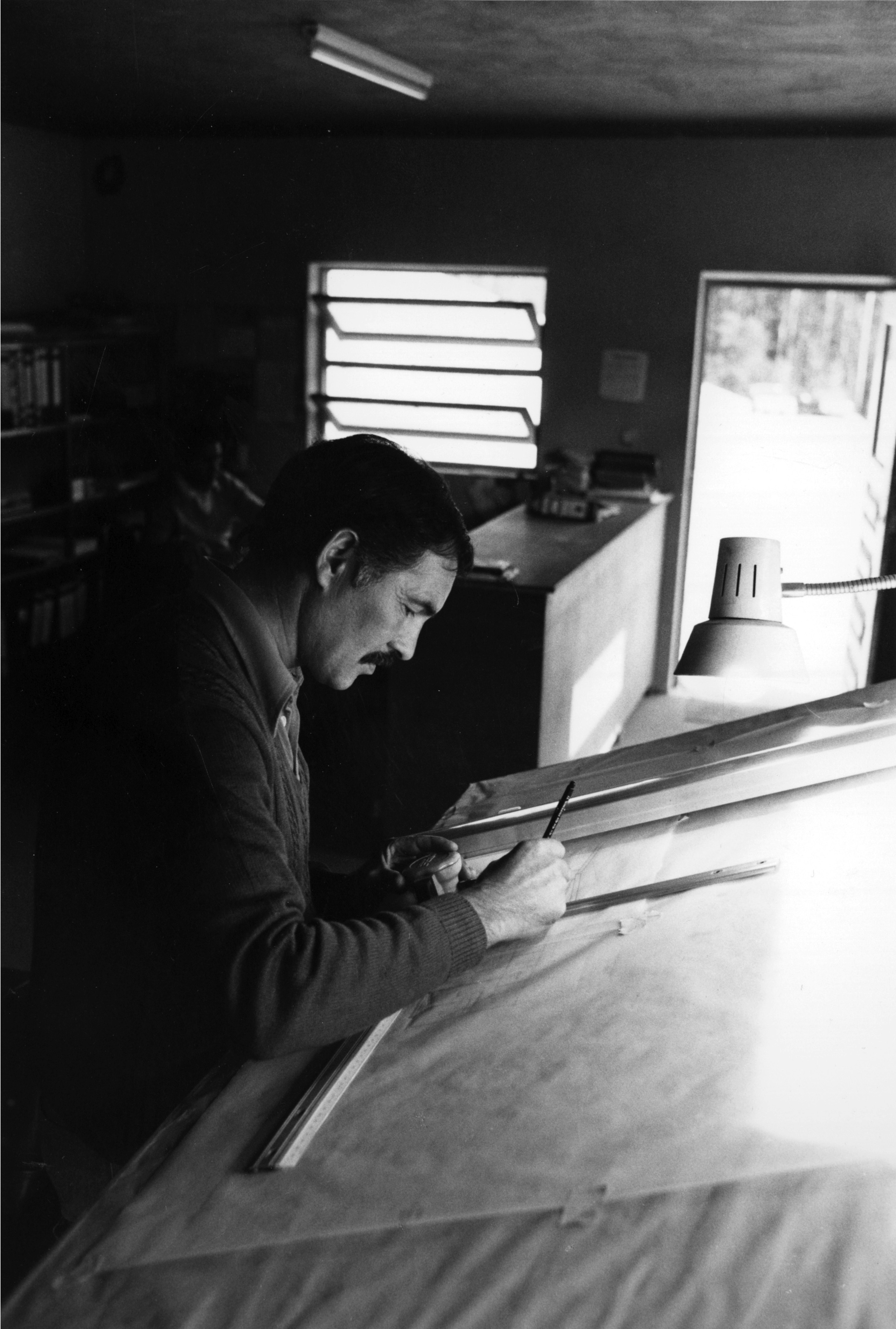
A drafter in Portugal in the 1970s, using a drafting machine

A drafter (also draughtsman / draughtswoman in British and Commonwealth English, draftsman / draftswoman, drafting technician, or CAD technician in American and Canadian English) is an engineering technician who makes detailed technical drawings or CAD drafts for machinery, buildings, electronics, infrastructure, sections, etc. Drafters use computer software and manual sketches to convert the designs, plans, and layouts of engineers and architects into a set of technical drawings. Drafters operate as the supporting developers and sketch engineering designs and drawings from preliminary design concepts.

== Overview ==
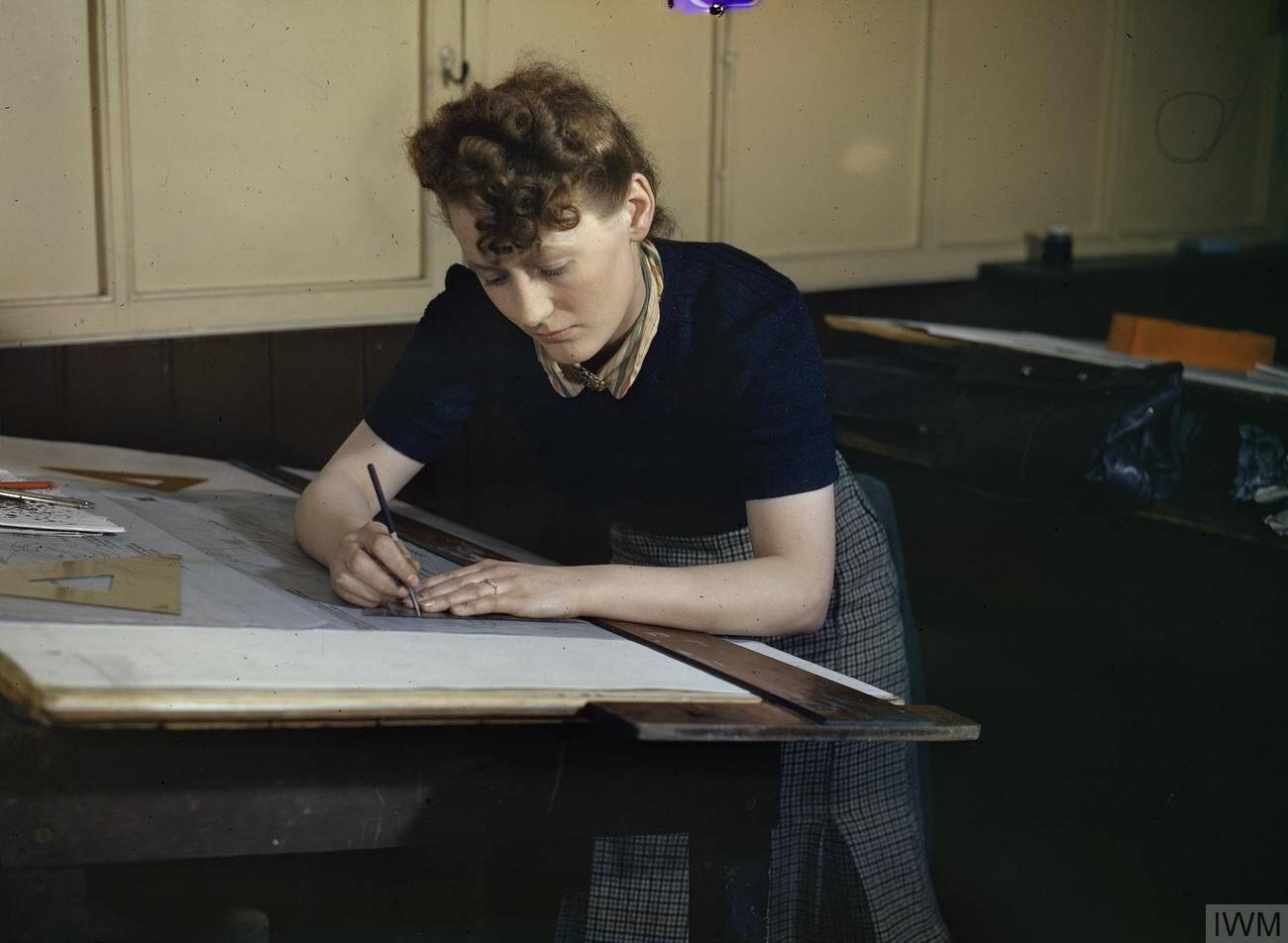
A drafter at work on a drawing of a 25-pound gun, 1942

In the past, drafters sat or stood at drawing boards and used pencils, pens, compasses, rulers, protractors, triangles, and other drafting devices to prepare a drawing by hand. From the 1980s through 1990s, board drawings were going out of style as the newly developed computer-aided design (CAD) system was released and was able to produce technical drawings at a faster pace.

Many modern drafters now use computer software such as AutoCAD, Revit, and SolidWorks to flesh out the designs of engineers or architects into technical drawings and blueprints but board drafting still remains the base of the CAD system. Many of these drawings are utilized to create structures, tools or machines. In addition, the drawings also include design specifications like dimensions, materials and procedures. Consequently, drafters may also be casually referred to as CAD operators, engineering draftspersons, or engineering technicians.

With CAD systems, drafters can create and store drawings electronically so that they can be viewed, printed, or programmed directly into automated manufacturing systems. CAD systems also permit drafters to quickly prepare variations of a design. Although drafters use CAD extensively, it is only a tool. Drafters still need knowledge of traditional drafting techniques, in addition to CAD skills. Despite the near global use of CAD systems, manual drafting and sketching are used in certain applications.

Drafters' drawings provide visual guidelines and show how to construct a product or structure. Drawings include technical details and specify dimensions, materials, and procedures. Drafters fill in technical details using drawings, rough sketches, specifications, and calculations made by engineers, surveyors, architects, or scientists. For example, drafters use their knowledge of standardized building techniques to draw in the details of a structure. Some use their understanding of engineering and manufacturing theory and standards to draw the parts of a machine; they determine design elements, such as the numbers and kinds of fasteners needed to assemble the machine. Drafters use technical handbooks, tables, calculators, and computers to complete their work.

== Specialties ==
Drafting work has many specialties such as:

- Aeronautical drafters prepare engineering drawings detailing plans and specifications used in the manufacture of aircraft, missiles, and related parts.
- Architectural drafters draw architectural and structural features of buildings and other structures. These designs are used in the construction or remodeling of homes, commercial buildings and power stations. These workers may specialize in a type of structure, such as residential or commercial, or in a kind of building material used, such as reinforced concrete, masonry, steel, or timber.
- Civil drafters prepare drawings and topographical and relief maps used in major construction or civil engineering infrastructure projects such as buildings, highways, railways, bridges, pipelines, flood-control projects, canals, and water and sewage systems.
- Electrical drafters prepare wiring and layout diagrams used by workers who erect, install, and repair electrical equipment and wiring in communication centers, power plants, electrical distribution systems, and buildings.
- Electronics drafters draw wiring diagrams, circuit board assembly diagrams, schematics, and layout drawings used in the manufacture, installation, and repair of electronic devices and components.
- Mechanical drafters prepare drawings showing the detail and assembly of a wide variety of machinery and mechanical devices, indicating dimensions, fastening methods, manufacturing equipment, and mechanical installation infrastructure.
- Process piping or pipeline drafters prepare drawings used in the layout, construction, and operation of oil and gas fields, refineries, chemical plants, and process piping systems.
- Photovoltaic drafters prepare drawings showing inverter Pad location drawings and slab construction drawings, also prepare specific photovoltaic system assembly details and some wiring diagrams.

== Employment and work environment ==
Video of a 1930s dotted-line drawing pen, as used by drafters

Drafters work in architectural offices, manufacturing companies, engineering firms, CAD-specific work-groups, construction companies, engineering consultancy firms, the government, natural resource companies or are independently self-employed. Drafting technologists and technicians often work as part of a broader multidisciplinary engineering team in support of engineers, architects or industrial designers or they may work on their own. The position of a drafter is one of a skilled assistant to architects and engineers. Drafters usually work in offices, seated at adjustable drawing boards or drafting tables when doing manual drawings, although modern drafters work at computer terminals much of the time. They usually work in an office environment, but some may have to travel and spend time on manufacturing plants or construction sites. As drafters spend long periods in front of computers doing detailed technical work, they may be susceptible to eyestrain, back discomfort, and hand and wrist problems. Most drafters work standard 40-hour weeks; only a small number work part-time.

== Education and training ==
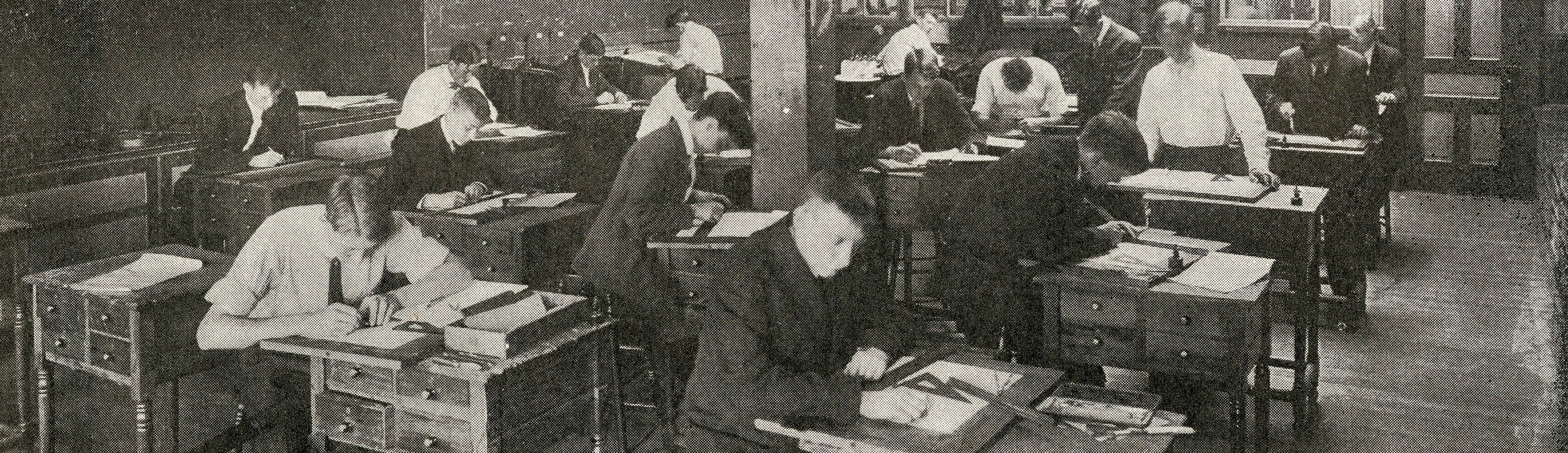
Students in a high school mechanical drawing classroom in Toledo, Ohio in 1912

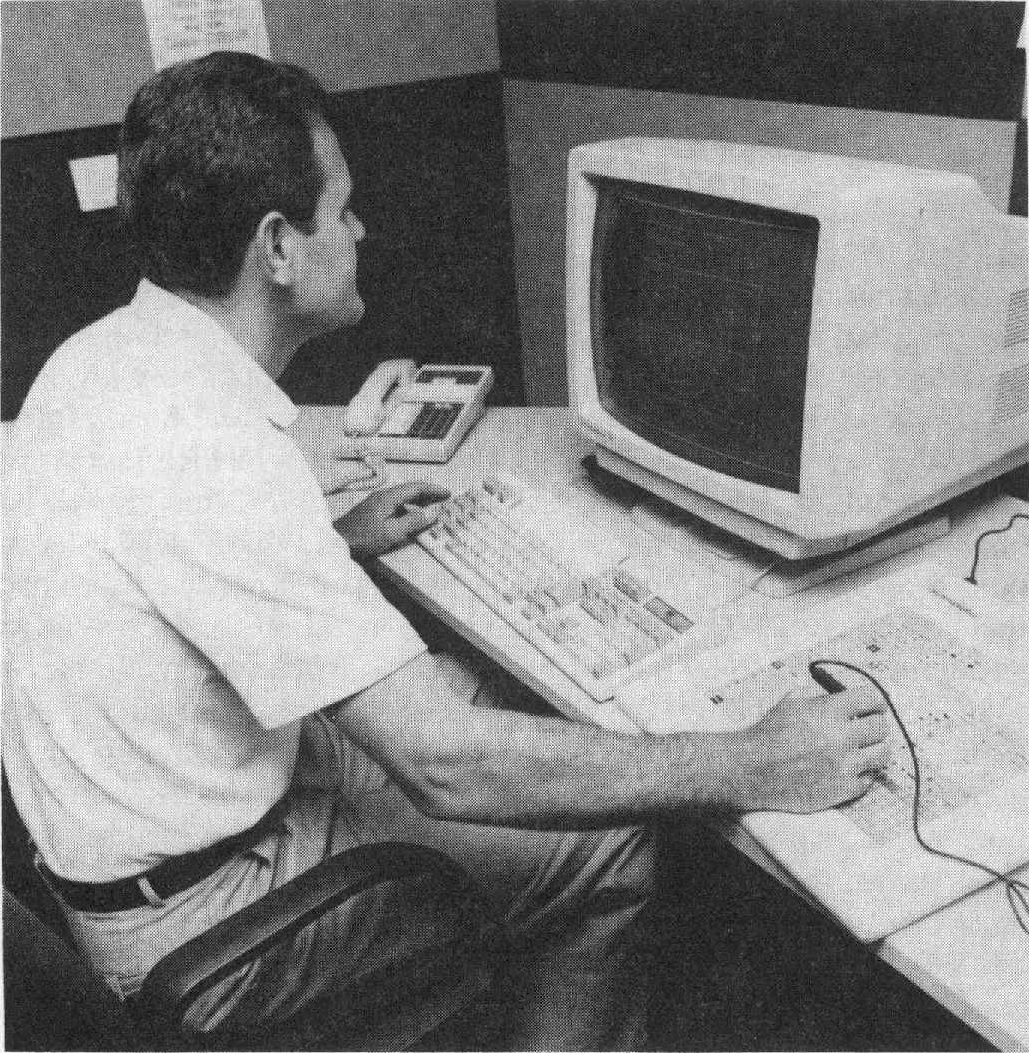
Drafter at work with CAD, 1992

High school courses in English, mathematics, science, electronics, computer technology, drafting and design, visual arts, and computer graphics are useful for people considering a drafting career. Attributes required by drafters include technical writing skills, problem-solving skills, the ability to visualize three-dimensional objects from two-dimensional drawings as well as drawing the relationships between parts in machinery and various pieces of infrastructure. Other skills include an in-depth knowledge of the qualities of metals, plastics, wood, bricks and stone and other materials used in the overall manufacturing processes and of construction methods and standards. Technical expertise, a strong understanding of construction and the manufacturing process, and a solid knowledge of drafting and design principles are also important assets. In the modern job marketplace, in addition to technical skills enabling CAD drafters to draw up plans, soft skills are also crucial as CADD drafters must communicate with clients and articulate their drawing plans in an effective way.

Employers prefer applicants who have also completed training at a trade or technical school. Prospective drafters will also need to have a strong background knowledge and experience with CADD software. Although licenses are not a prerequisite for becoming drafters, the American Design Drafting Association (ADDA) offers certification and licensing. Drafting and design certificates and diplomas are generally offered by vocational institutes such as career training schools, trade and technical schools, and non-university higher educational institutions such as community colleges or industrial training institutes. Licensing and certification highlights one's core competence and knowledge of a specific drafting specialty.

Apprenticeships combine paid on-the-job training and practical work experience with theoretical in-class instruction. Those interested in becoming drafters can earn qualifications as either drafting technologists or drafting technicians. Drafting technologists usually have a two- to three-year diploma in engineering design or drafting technology from a community college or technical school. Drafters starting out may move from company to company to gain experience and rise up in the professional ranks. Alternatively, they may start their own business and become self-employed.

More seasoned drafters can rise through professional ranks into a management position. There, they are tasked with supervising entire projects in addition to overseeing and delegating junior and entry-level drafters. Experienced drafters may enter related fields such as engineering, architecture, industrial design, interior design, exhibit design, landscape design, set design, and animation.

== Notable drafters ==
- Harry Beck, an English technical draughtsman who created the first diagrammatic Tube map for the London Underground in 1931.
- Alvar Aalto, a Finnish architect and designer who designed many significant buildings in Finland.

== See also ==
- Architectural technologist
- Engineering technician
- Leonor Ferrer Girabau
- Steel detailer
- Technical drawing tools
