= Steel detailer =

A steel detailer is a person who produces detailed drawings for steel fabricators and steel erectors. The detailer prepares detailed plans, drawings and other documents for the manufacture and erection of steel members (columns, beams, braces, trusses, stairs, handrails, joists, metal decking, etc.) used in the construction of buildings, bridges, industrial plans, and nonbuilding structures.

Steel detailers (usually simply called detailers within their field) work closely with architects, engineers, general contractors and steel fabricators. They usually find employment with steel fabricators, engineering firms, or independent steel detailing companies. Steel detailing companies and self-employed detailers subcontract primarily to steel fabricators and sometimes to general contractors and engineers.

== Training and certification ==
=== United States ===
Collegiate degree programs specific to structural steel detailing are rare to nonexistent in the U.S., but more general degree and certification programs may be found with curricula pertaining to design, manual or computer-aided drafting in general, or specific computer-aided drafting software. A college degree is not required to become a steel detailer in the U.S. Training is usually provided on the job, with a new trainee usually needing about five years of practice under an experienced detailer to become proficient with all of the requirements of the trade. Practitioners of this occupation in the U.S. may range from degreed, and possibly licensed, civil/structural engineers to those with little or no formal academic training who nevertheless possess extensive industry experience.

Certification of structural steel detailers is not required in the United States. The National Institute of Steel Detailing (NISD) offers a selection of certification programs for steel detailers and detailing companies, but these are strictly voluntary.

=== Canada ===
In Vancouver, British Columbia, Canada there are College courses specifically for Steel Detailing. Vancouver Community College Downtown Campus has been offering a Steel Detailing Certificate for many years. It is approximately a one-year program. BCIT (British Columbia Institute of Technology) also offers training. Many of the most well trained Steel Detailers in British Columbia have attended these institutions.

== Responsibilities ==
A steel detailer prepares two primary types of drawings: erection drawings and shop drawings.

Erection drawings are used to guide the steel erector on the construction site ("in the field") as to where and how to erect the fabricated steel members. These drawings usually show dimensioned plans to locate the steel members, and they often also show details with specific information and requirements, including all work that must be done in the field (such as bolting, welding or installing wedge anchors). Since the erection drawings are intended for use in the field, they contain very little specific information about the fabrication of any individual steel member; members should already be completed by the time the erection drawings are used.

Shop drawings, also called detail drawings, are used to specify the exact detailing requirements for fabricating each individual member (or "piece") of a structure, and are used by the steel fabricator to fabricate these members. Complete shop drawings show material specifications, member sizes, all required dimensions, welding, bolting, surface preparation and painting requirements, and any other information required to describe each completed member. The shop drawings are intended for use by the fabrication shop, and thus contain little or no information about the erection and installation of the steel members they depict; this information belongs in the erection drawings.

The detailer must comply with the requirements of the design drawings and with all industry standards and protocols, such as those established by the American Institute of Steel Construction (AISC) and the American Welding Society (AWS). The detailer is usually not responsible for design, including structural strength, stiffness, and stability (which are the responsibility of the structural engineer), major dimensions of the structure and compliance with relevant building codes (which are the responsibility of the architect). A detailer is generally required to submit his drawings to the structural engineer and/or architect for review prior to the release of drawings for fabrication. However, to complete his drawings, an experienced steel detailer usually suggests connections subject to the approval of the structural engineer in cases where the structural drawings have insufficient information. In these situations, the steel detailer is guided by his experience and knowledge of existing engineering codes such as the Steel Construction Manual published by AISC.

In the case of non-building structures there is typically no architect, and detail drawings are reviewed exclusively by the structural engineer of record. This design review ideally assures engineering accuracy and compliance with the design intent.

== Techniques ==
Traditionally, steel detailing was accomplished via manual drafting methods, using pencils, paper, and drafting tools such as a parallel bar or drafting machine, triangles, templates of circles and other useful shapes, and mathematical tables, such as tables of logarithms and other useful calculational aids. Eventually, hand-held calculators were incorporated into the traditional practice.

Today, manual drafting has been largely replaced by computer-aided drafting (CAD). A steel detailer using computer-aided methods creates drawings on a computer, using software specifically designed for the purpose, and printing out drawings on paper only when they are complete. Many detailers would add another classification for those using 3-D Modeling applications specifically designed for steel detailing, as the process for the production of drawings using these applications is markedly different from a 2-D drafting approach. The detailer literally builds the project in 3D before producing detailed shop drawings from the model.

Structural steel detailing requires skills in drafting, mathematics (including geometry and trigonometry), logic, reasoning, spatial visualization, and communication. A basic knowledge of general engineering principles and the methods of structural and miscellaneous steel fabrication, however acquired, is essential to the practice of this discipline. A computer-aided detailer also requires skills in using computers and an understanding of the specific CAD software used.

A detailer's drawings generally go through several phases. If there is any unclear information that would prevent the detailer from creating or completing the drawings accurately, a request for information(RFI) is sent to the relevant trades(typically the general contractor, architect or structural engineer) before proceeding. If the required information is not needed immediately, then the detailer may opt to list the questions on the drawings. Following creation of the drawing, the detailer must usually (as described above) submit a copy of the drawing to the architect and engineer for review ("approval"). Copies of the drawing may be sent to other recipients at this time as well, such as the general contractor, for informational purposes only. The drawing must also be checked for accuracy and completeness by another detailer (for this purpose, the "checker"). To keep track of changes during the drawing creation workflow, the revisions are identified by incrementing an associated number or letter code which should appear in the drawing revision block. Comments arising from approval and corrections made during checking must be resolved, and the original drawing must be updated accordingly (or "scrubbed"). After this, the drawing may be released to the fabricator and/or erector for use in construction.

== List of steel detailing software ==
Title and developer	2D/3D	Supports BIM?	Supports IFC?	Supports DXF?	Supports KISS?	Supports DSTV?	Supports SDNF?	Supports CIS/2?
StruCAD by AceCad	2D/3D	Yes	Yes	Yes	Yes	Yes	Yes	Yes
Bocad by AVEVA	2D/3D	Yes	Yes	Yes	Yes	Yes	Yes	Yes
Advance Steel by Autodesk	2D/3D	Yes	Yes	Yes	Yes	Yes	Yes	Yes
AutoSD, Inc.	2D	No	No	Yes	Yes	Yes	No	No
Parabuild	2D/3D	Yes	Yes	Yes	Yes	Yes	No	Yes
ProSteel by Bentley Systems	2D/3D	Yes	Yes	Yes	Yes	Yes	Yes	Yes
Tekla Structures by Trimble Navigation	2D/3D	Yes	Yes	Yes	Yes	Yes	Yes	Yes
TecnoMETAL by Steel&Graphics	2D/3D	Yes	Yes	Yes	Yes	Yes	Yes	Yes
SDS/2 by Nemetscheck	2D/3D	Yes	Yes	Yes	Yes	Yes	Yes	Yes
Soft Steel	2D/3D	Unknown	Unknown	Unknown	Unknown	Unknown	Unknown	Unknown
SSDCP	2D	Unknown	Unknown	Yes	Unknown	Unknown	Unknown	Unknown
SOLIDWORKS	3D	Unknown	Unknown	Yes	Unknown	Yes	Yes	Unknown
TSD (The Steel Detailer)	3D	Unknown	Unknown	Yes	Unknown	Yes	Yes	Unknown
TSteel 3D by Techsteel	2D/3D	Yes	Yes	No	Unknown	Unknown	Yes	Unknown

== See also ==
- Drafter
- List of construction occupations
- Modeler
- Model Checker
- Drawing Checker
