= Leonor Ferrer Girabau =

Spanish draftsperson

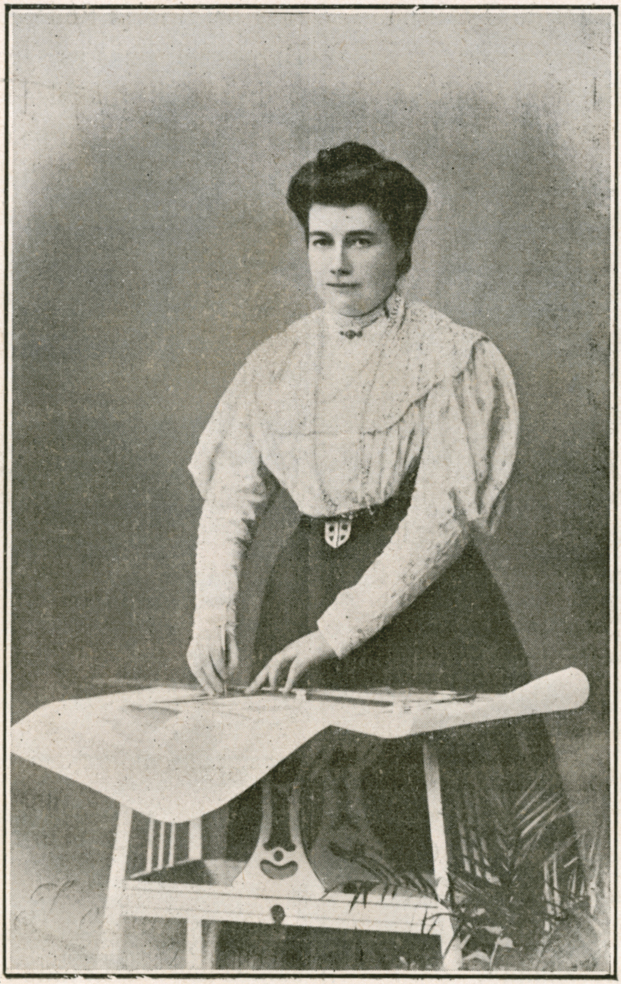
- Ferrer, 1908
- Born: 1 July 1874; Barcelona, Spain
- Died: 1953 (aged 78–79); Barcelona, Spain
- Other name: Leonor Ferrer
- Occupations: Draftswoman, teacher
- Known for: First woman draftsperson in Spain

Leonor Ferrer Girabau (1 July 1874 – 1953) (sometimes spelled Leonor Ferrer i Girabau but widely known as Leonor Ferrer) was the first female draftsperson in Spain (1905).

== Biography ==
She was born in Barcelona. In 1897, Ferrer obtained the title of teacher. On 13 March 1905, she earned the title of expert draftsman issued by the Friends of the Country Economic Society, Teaching Section, School of Governesses and Other Careers for Women and became the first woman in Spain to obtain the degree.

She had been working as a draughtswoman for more than six years when she obtained her degree in 1905. To qualify, she had studied technical drawing, topographical drawing, geometry and trigonometry between 1902 and 1904.

Between 1898 and 1931, she worked for the General Telephone Society, which later became the Peninsular Telephone Company. She entered by competitive examination as a telephone operator but in 1899, and thanks to her knowledge of drawing, she became an assistant to the draftsman Juan Marxuach. When she left the company, she was appointed head of the Plans Section, directing a team that included, among others: Eulàlia Fàbregas, Teresa Torrens and Maria Grau. Her task was recognized in the publications of the time: "her expertise in the highly useful art that she cultivates, the success and beauty of her drawings, the seriousness with which she carries out her mission have earned her trust and appreciation of the important Barcelona society."

From the second decade of the 20th century, Ferrer dedicated herself to teaching drawing, starting at the Institute of Culture and Popular Library of Women, a private institution dedicated to the education and promotion of women, which was founded by Francesca Bonnemaison in 1909 in the Sant Pere district of Barcelona. Next Ferrer opened her own school under the name of Drawing Academy for Young Ladies at her home at number 10, Calle de Grasas del Pueblo Seco, Barcelona.

In 1931, Ferrer left the telephone company, which had been converted in 1924 into the Compañía Telefónica Nacional de España (precursor of Telefónica). Between 1936 and 1939 she worked as a school teacher in the Balearic Islands: first in Búger and later in the Nuestra Señora de Pilar de la Mola School in Formentera. In the 1940s, she practiced in the city of Mercadal, on the island of Menorca.

She became a member of the Spanish General Association of Draughtsmen. A collection of her work can be found at the Institute of Cartography and Geology of Catalonia (Institut Cartogràfic i Geològic de Catalunya). She died in Barcelona.
