= Submittals (construction) =

Documents in construction project management

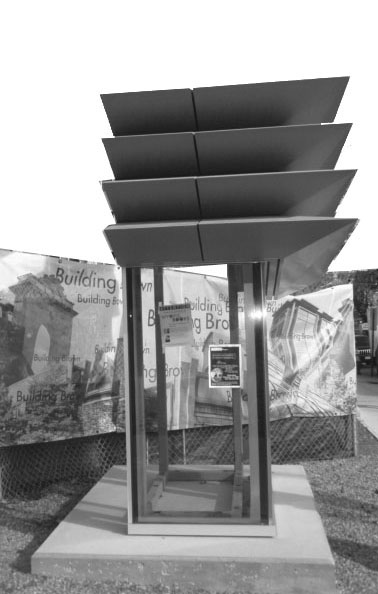
A wall mock-up.

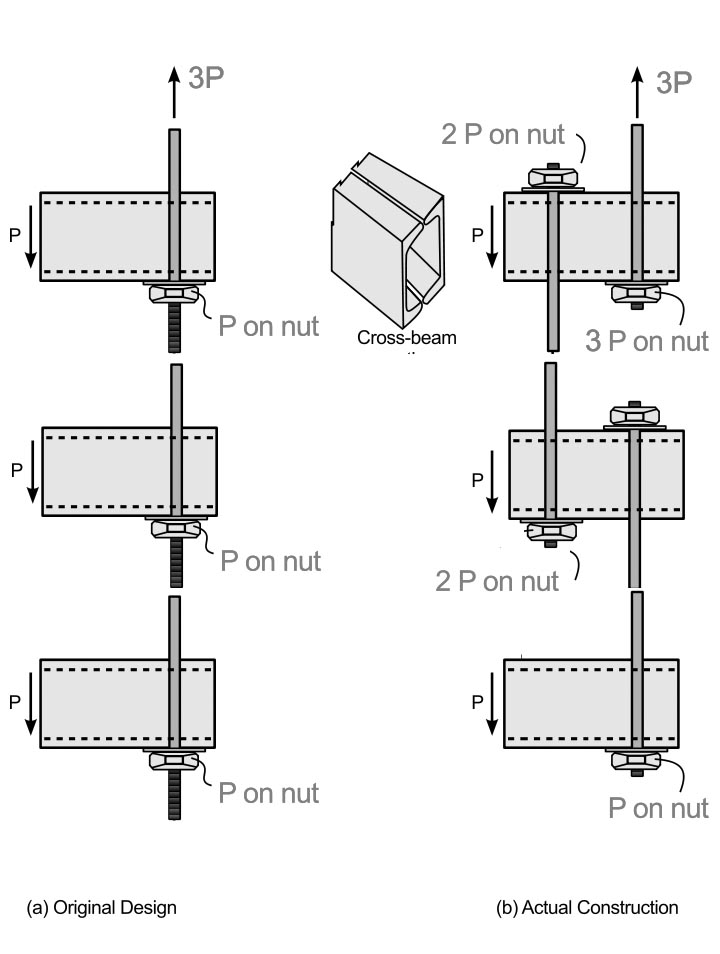
This detail compares the original design (left) and the submitted alternate detail for the skywalks at the Hyatt Regency, Kansas City. The proposed alternate compounded the loads on the bolts, which resulted in the skywalks collapsing on July 17, 1981. 114 people were killed. This example illustrates the importance of submittal review.

Submittals in construction management can include: shop drawings, material data, samples, and product data. Submittals are required primarily for the architect and engineer to verify that the correct products will be installed on the project.

This process also gives the architect and sub-consultants the opportunity to select colors, patterns, and types of material that were not chosen prior to completion of the construction drawings. This is not an occasion for the architect to select different materials than specified, but rather to clarify the selection within the quality level indicated in the specification and quantities shown on plans.

For materials requiring fabrication, such as reinforcing steel and structural steel, the architect and engineer need to verify details furnished by the fabricator as well as the required quantities are met. The details from the fabricator reflect both material availability and production expediency. One tragic example of a submitted alternate design is the suspension rod and bolting details resulting in the Hyatt Regency walkway collapse. The steel fabricator was unable to produce lengths of steel as originally designed and instead proposed using shorter lengths. The proposed alternate compounded the loads on the bolts, which resulted in the skywalks collapsing on July 17, 1981. 114 people were killed.

The contractor also uses this information in installation, using dimensions and installation data from the submittal. The construction documents, specifically the technical specifications, require the contractor to submit product data, samples, and shop drawings to the architect and engineer for approval. This is one of the first steps that is taken by the contractor after execution of the construction contract and issuance of the "Notice to Proceed".

The submittal process affects cost, quality, schedule, and project success. On large, commercial projects the submittal process can involve thousands of different materials, fabrications and equipment. Commercial buildings will often have complex pre-fabricated components. These include: elevators, windows, cabinets, air handling units, generators, appliances and cooling towers. These pieces of equipment often require close coordination to ensure that they receive the correct power, fuel, water and structural support. The submittal process gives another level of detail usually not included as part of the design documents.

An "approved" submittal authorizes quantity and quality of a material or an assembly to be released for fabrication and shipment. It ensures that the submittals have been properly vetted before final ordering. In essence, this is the final quality control mechanism before a product arrives on-site.

== Types of Submittals ==
=== Product Data Submittal ===
The product data submittal usually consists of the manufacturer's product information. The information included in this submittal are:

- Manufacturer, trade name, model or type number and quantities: This information is necessary to compare the submitted item with the specified products and acceptable products listed, in the specification and addenda.
- Description of use and performance characteristics: Information should be furnished describing the normal use and expected performance of the product. The architect and contractor reviews this information to confirm that the product is appropriate for the intended use.
- Size and physical characteristics: The size and physical characteristics, such as adjustment capabilities, which is reviewed by both the contractor and architect. The contractor has the most available information for comparing adjoining materials and equipment. The contractor also needs to know the size and weight of the equipment for lifting and handling considerations.
- Finish characteristics: The architect reviews the available finishes and selects the appropriate finish, if the finish was not previously specified in the documents. The contractor should confirm that finish requirements in the specification are being met by the product.
- Specific request for jobsite dimensions: Some materials are custom-fabricated to job conditions, requiring dimensions from the jobsite. These jobsite dimensions are provided by the contractor, prior to release of the product for manufacture.

=== Shop Drawing ===
See the article: Shop drawing.

=== Samples ===
Many products require submission of samples. A sample is a physical portion of the specified product. Some samples are full product samples, such as a brick or section of precast concrete, or a partial sample that indicates color or texture. The product sample is often required when several products are acceptable, to confirm the quality and aesthetic level of the material. The size or unit of sample material usually is specified.

For some materials, a mock-up or sample panel is necessary. A common example of a sample panel is a wall mock-up. This is a full size mock-up of a wall assembly and can include window, exterior veneers and waterproofing. The mock-up serves as both an aesthetic review, but also provides the contractors the opportunity to field test the assembly before full-scale assembly. The mock up may be required to be tested for water tightness and lateral forces. The mock-up panel might be 10 feet wide by 12 feet high, showing the full wall span from floor to floor.

Samples usually are required for finish selection or approval. Color and textures in the actual product can vary considerably from the color and textures shown in printed material. The printed brochure gives an indication of available colors, but the colors are rendered in printer's ink, rather than in the actual material. A quality level may be specified, requiring a selection of color and/or texture from sample pieces of the material. Several acceptable manufacturers may be listed in the specification and a level of quality also may be specified. The contractor, subcontractor, or supplier may have a preference for one of these products, based on price, availability, quality, workability, or service.

Samples are usually stored at the jobsite and compared to the material delivered and installed. Comparison of samples with the product received is an important part of project quality control.

== Review of Submittals ==
Processing time is required to produce and review submittals, shop drawings, and samples. The procedures can seem very cumbersome and time consuming, however, there are substantial reasons for review steps by all parties. The designer is ultimately responsible for the design of the facility to meet occupancy needs and must ensure that the products being installed are suitable to meet these needs. Any change in material fabrication or quantity needs to be reviewed for its acceptability with the original design. Both the architect, contractor and sub-contractor need to be able to coordinate the installation of the product with other building systems.

Each level must review, add information as necessary, and stamp or seal that the submittal was examined and approved by that party. After the submittal reaches the primary reviewer, it is returned through the same steps, which provides an opportunity for further comment and assures that each party is aware of the approval, partial approval, notes, or rejection. This approval process is cumbersome and time-consuming. However, modern software products can greatly simplify and improve the efficiency.

Typically, the architect will review the submittal for compliance to the requirement in the construction documents. Revisions may be noted on the submittal. Colors and other selection items will be made by the architect during this review. Sometimes the architect will reject the entire submittal and other times will request resubmittal of some of the items. The architect also will make corrections, which normally do not need to be resubmitted, but that do need to be applied to the product. While the architect and engineers review products for performance and design intent, the contractor must review the product for preparation, quantity and installation requirements.

The contractor should manage the submittal process just like any other process in the construction cycle. The submittal process requires lead-time consideration to produce the submittal, shop drawing (engineering), review and revise and the shop fabrication period. Careful planning is necessary to ensure that the products are ordered and delivered within the construction schedule, so as not to delay any activities. The contractor must prioritize the submittal process, submitting and obtaining approval for materials needed for the first part of the project. Present-day submittal software for the construction industry can help streamline that process by grouping submittals by submittal types, using a standard material library, and ability to filter by the due date or status.
