= Tekla Structures =

Software for modeling building structures

- A screenshot of Tekla Structures 16 on Windows 7
- Developer: Tekla
- Stable release: 2025 / March 2025
- Operating system: Microsoft Windows
- Platform: x64
- Type: CAD, building information modeling
- License: Proprietary
- Website: tekla.com/products/tekla-structures

Tekla Structures is a 3D building information modeling software able to model structures that incorporate different kinds of building materials, including steel, concrete, timber and glass. Tekla allows structural drafters and engineers to design a building structure and its components using 3D modeling, generate 2D drawings and access building information. Tekla Structures was formerly known as Xsteel (X as in X Window System, the foundation of the Unix GUI).

== Features ==
Tekla Structures is used in the construction industry for steel and concrete detailing, precast and cast in-situ. The software enables users to create and manage 3D structural models in concrete or steel, and guides them through the process from concept to fabrication. The process of shop drawing creation is automated. It is available in different configurations and localized environments.

Tekla Structures is known to support large models with multiple simultaneous users, but is regarded as relatively expensive, complex to learn and fully utilize. It competes in the BIM market with AutoCAD, Autodesk Revit, DProfiler and Digital Project, Lucas Bridge, PERICad and others. Tekla Structures is Industry Foundation Classes (IFC) compliant.

Modeling scopes within Tekla Structures includes Structural Steel, Cast-in-Place (CIP), Concrete, Reinforcing Bar, Miscellaneous Steel and Light Gauge Drywall Framing. The transition of Xsteel to Tekla Structures in 2004 added significant more functionality and interoperability. It is often used in conjunction with Autodesk Revit, where structural framing is designed in Tekla and exported to Revit using the IFC or DWG/DXF formats.

== Applications ==
Engineers have used Tekla Structures to model stadiums, offshore structures, pipe rack structures, plants, factories, residential buildings, bridges and skyscrapers. Tekla Structures was used in the construction design for various projects around the world, including:

- Grandstand Replacement, Daytona International Speedway (USA)
- Frontstretch Grandstands, Daytona International Speedway (USA)
- Denver International Airport Expansion (USA)
- San Jose Earthquakes Stadium (USA)
- BB&T Ballpark (Charlotte, USA)
- Spillway Replacement, Manitoba Hydro (USA)
- National Stadium Roof, Singapore Sports Hub (Singapore)
- Red Bear Student Center, University of Saskatchewan (Canada)
- Troja Bridge (Prague)
- Tesco Supermarket (Sheringham, UK)
- Baylor University Stadium (Australia)
- Canopée des Halles, Forum des Halles (Paris, France)
- Sutter Medical Center (California, USA)
- Expansion, Chennai International Airport (India)
- Dongdaemun Design Plaza (Seoul)
- Capital Gate (Abu Dhabi)
- Midfield Terminal Complex, Abu Dhabi Airport (Abu Dhabi)
- King Abdullah Financial District (Saudi Arabia)
- King Abdulaziz Center for World Culture (Saudi Arabia)
- National Museum of Qatar (Qatar)
- Hilton Garden Inn (UAE)
- Puuvilla Shopping Centre (Finland)
- College Football Hall of Fame (Atlanta, GA)
- Optus Stadium (Perth, Australia)

Tekla Structures was used extensively for the steel design of Capital Gate at Abu Dhabi, UAE. Files exported from Tekla facilitated faster steel fabrication. One of the architects, Jeff Schofield, stated that "it was the right time in history and we had the right technology to make this happen".

The Manitoba Hydro Spillway Replacement was designed using Tekla Structures to "successfully model and co-ordinate its design", a project that won the TEKLA 2012 North American BIM Award for "Best Concrete Project". It was the "first hydroelectric project that has seen steel, concrete, and rebar fully detailed using Tekla Structures".

== Stable version release - history dates ==
- Tekla Structures 16.0 - March 2010
- Tekla Structures 17.0 - February 2011
- Tekla Structures 18.0 - March 2012
- Tekla Structures 19.0 - March 2013
- Tekla Structures 20.0 - February 2014
- Tekla Structures 21.0 - March 2015
- Tekla Structures 2016 - March 2016
- Tekla Structures 2017 - March 2017
- Tekla Structures 2018 - March 2018
- Tekla Structures 2019 - March 2019
- Tekla Structures 2020 - March 2020
- Tekla Structures 2021 - March 2021
- Tekla Structures 2022 - March 2022
- Tekla Structures 2023 - March 2023
- Tekla Structures 2024 - March 2024
- Tekla Structures 2025 - March 2025
- Tekla Structures 2026 - March 2026

== See also ==
- Comparison of CAD editors for CAE
