= Kauppakeskus Puuvilla =

Shopping mall in Pori, Finland

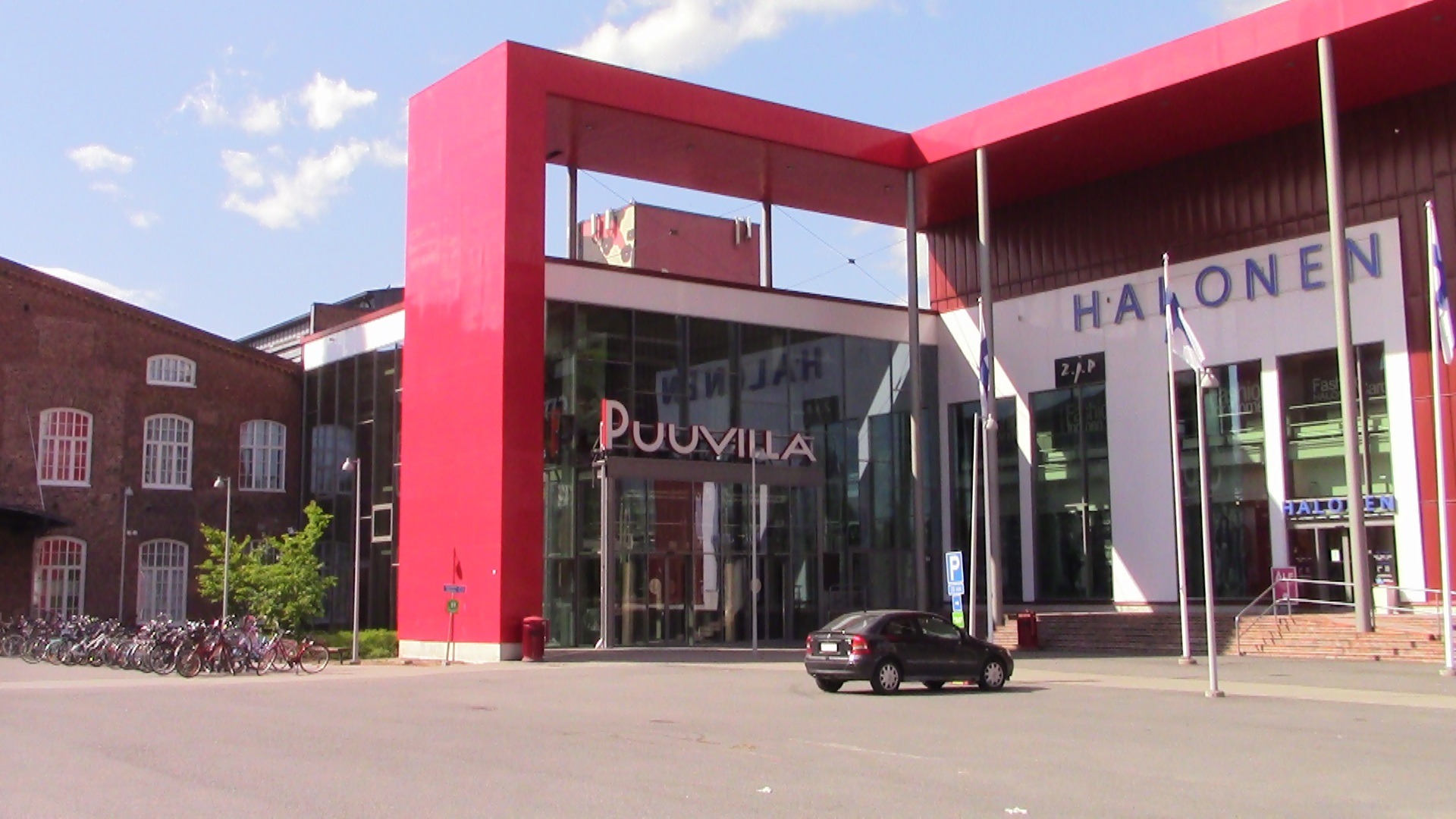
- Address: Siltapuistokatu 14, Pori, Finland
- Opened: 30 October 2014
- Owner: Renor, Ilmarinen
- Architect: Arkkitehtikonttori Pussinen & Küttner Oy
- Num. of stores: over 70
- Floors: 3
- Parking: 2 000

Kauppakeskus Puuvilla (Finnish for "Shopping Center Cotton", named after the Pori cotton factory) is a shopping mall in Pori, Finland. It is located near central Pori in the Isosanta district.

It was built mainly on the site of the weaving mill of the former Pori cotton factory, which was destroyed in a fire in 1981. Construction work on the shopping center began in November 2012. The center opened on October 30, 2014. In 2017, Puuvilla was chosen as the shopping center of the year in Finland.

Puuvilla is the largest shopping center in Satakunta and ranks among the ten largest in the whole country. Its developers are Renor Oy and the pension insurance company Ilmarinen. The main contractor was Skanska. The investment value of the construction project was approximately 130 million euros. The construction focused especially on energy efficiency, and Puuvilla was the lowest-emitting shopping center in Finland in 2017, according to KTI Kiinteistötieto's research.

Ruokakesko Oy, the largest operator in the shopping center, rented approximately 7,000 square meters of space for the K-Citymarket grocery store. There is a total of 43,000 m² of commercial space in Puuvilla. Puuvilla has over 70 shops and 2,000 free parking spaces.

Along with the shopping center, Puuvilla forms a city block that connects the operating environment for companies from different fields as well as educational organizations and public sector service units. For example, Pohjois-Pori health center and dental clinic and Central Dental Clinic operate in connection with Puuvilla.

The square in the middle of the shopping center hosts events, and it is also one of the meeting places for the annual SuomiAreena held in Pori.

In 2018, major expansions were planned for the shopping center. In November 2018, the coffee shop chain Espresso House opened a coffee shop of approximately 300 square meters and 140 seats on the street level of the center.

== Images ==
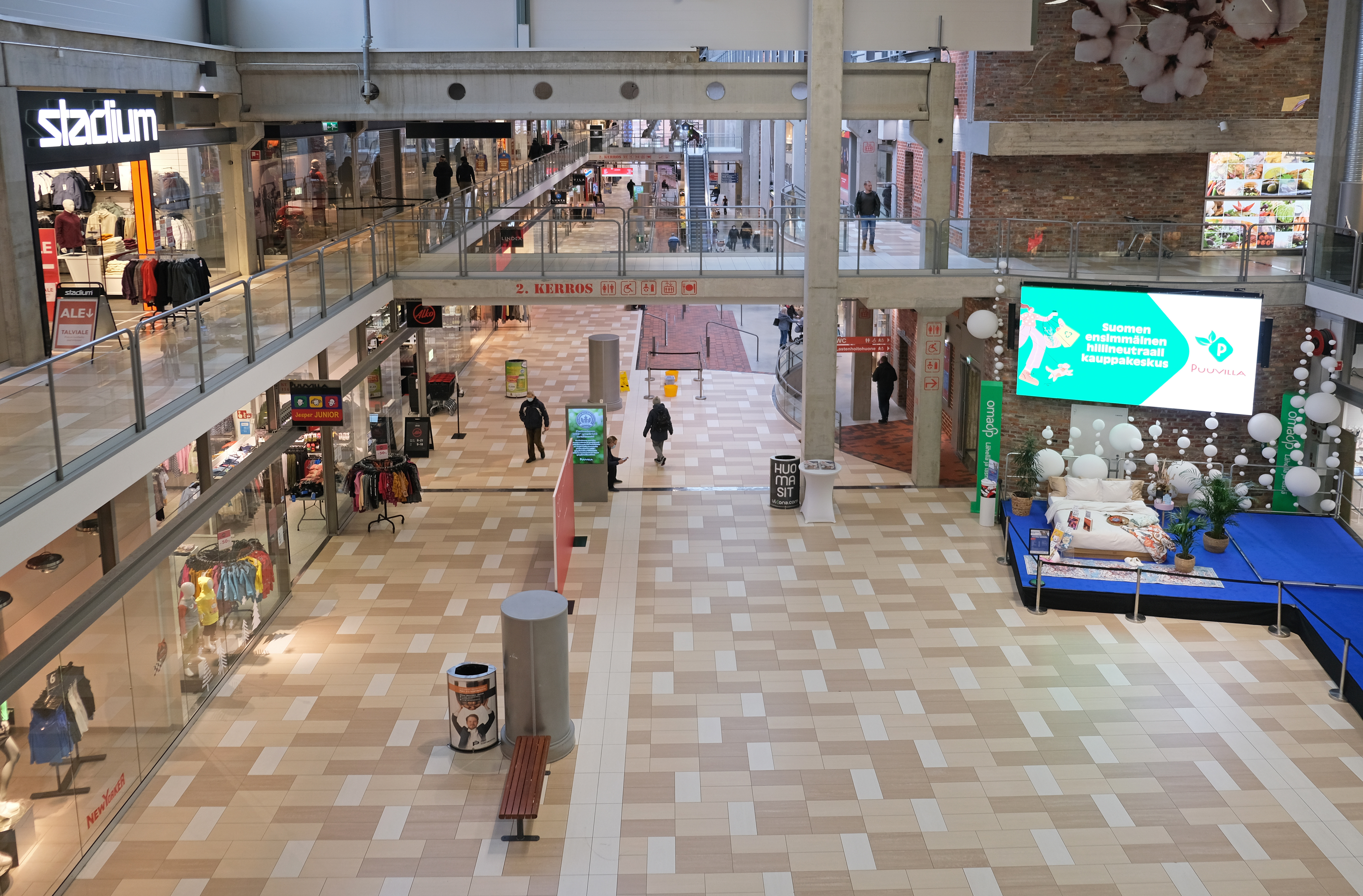

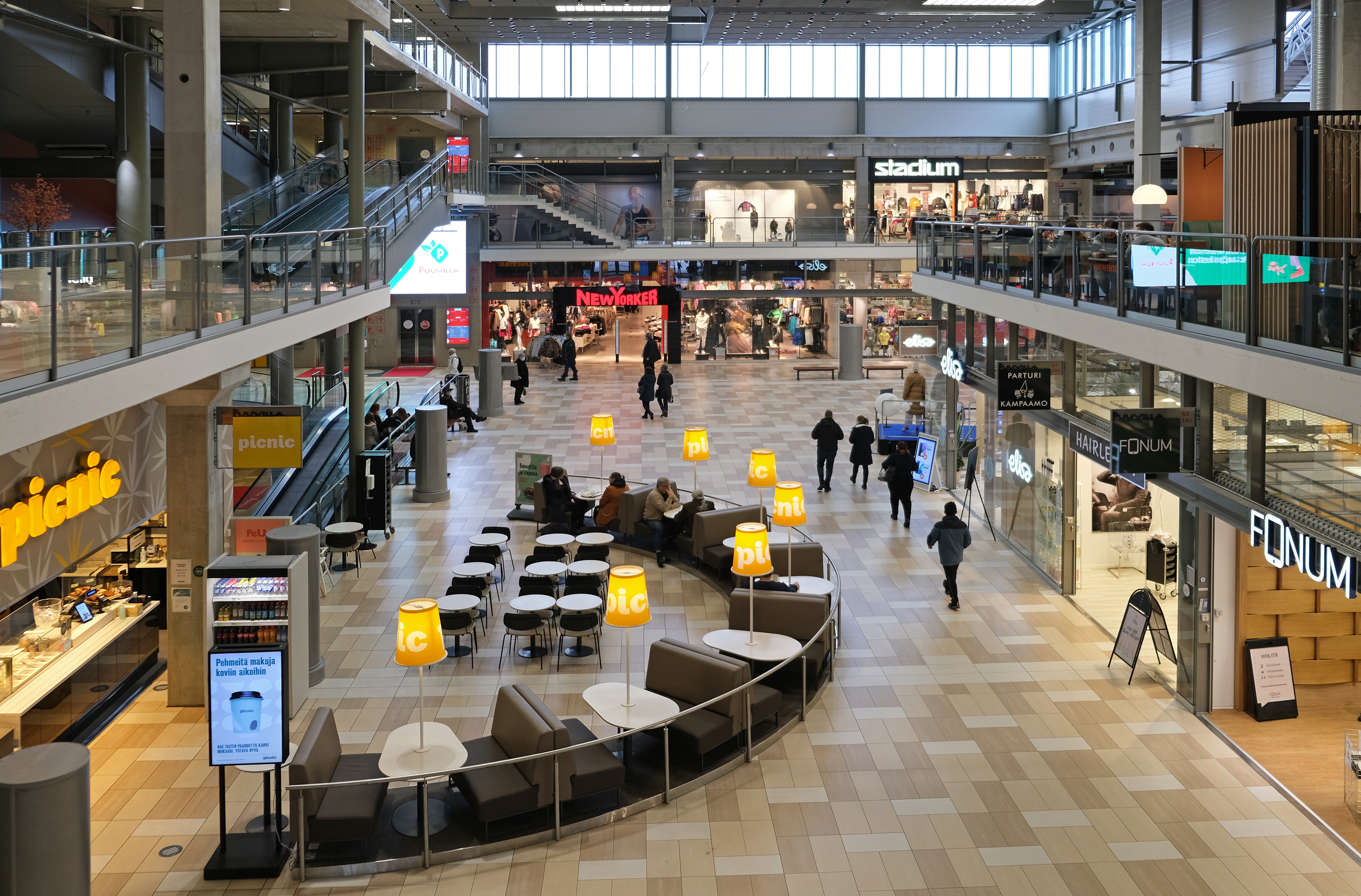

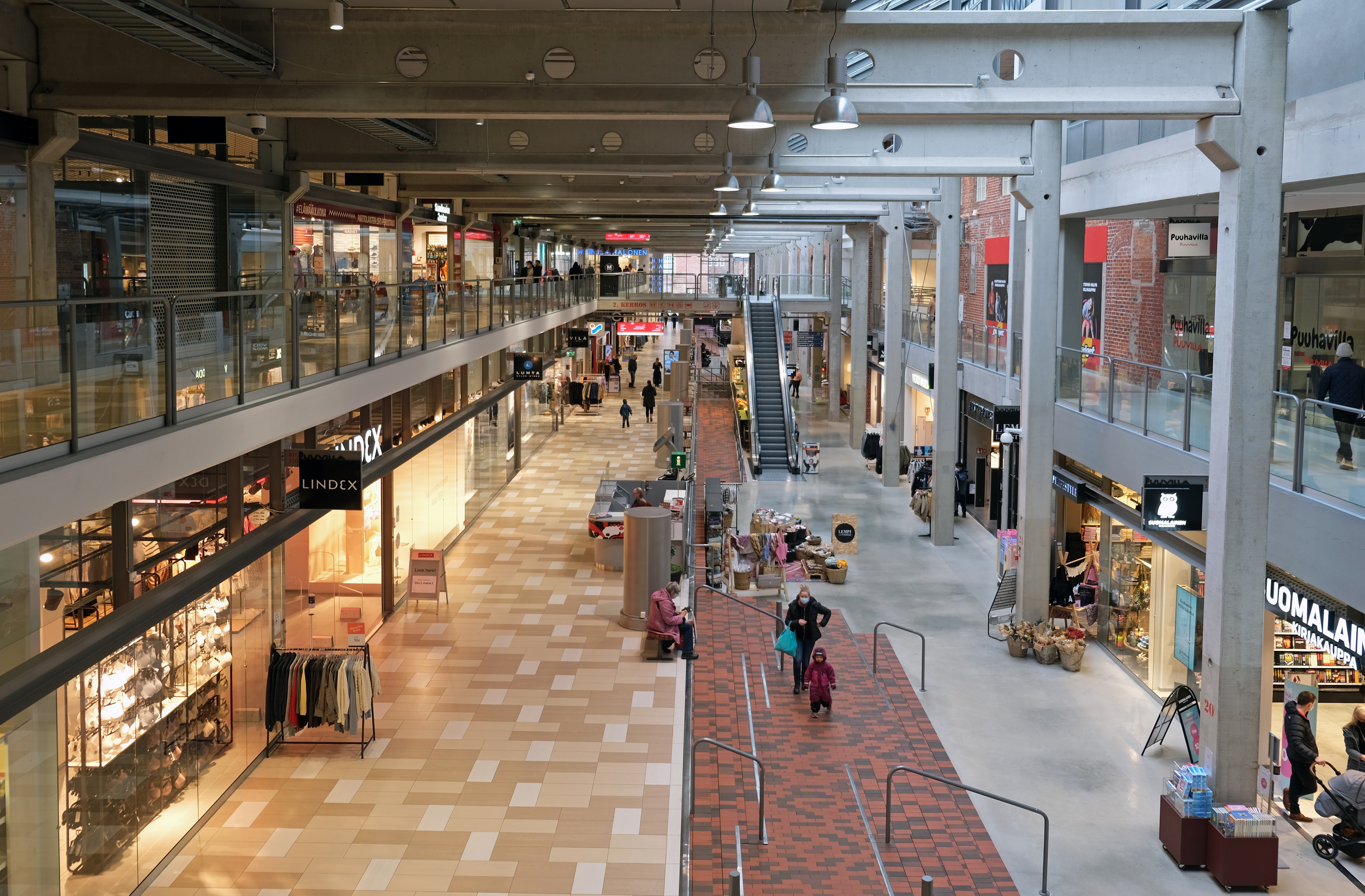

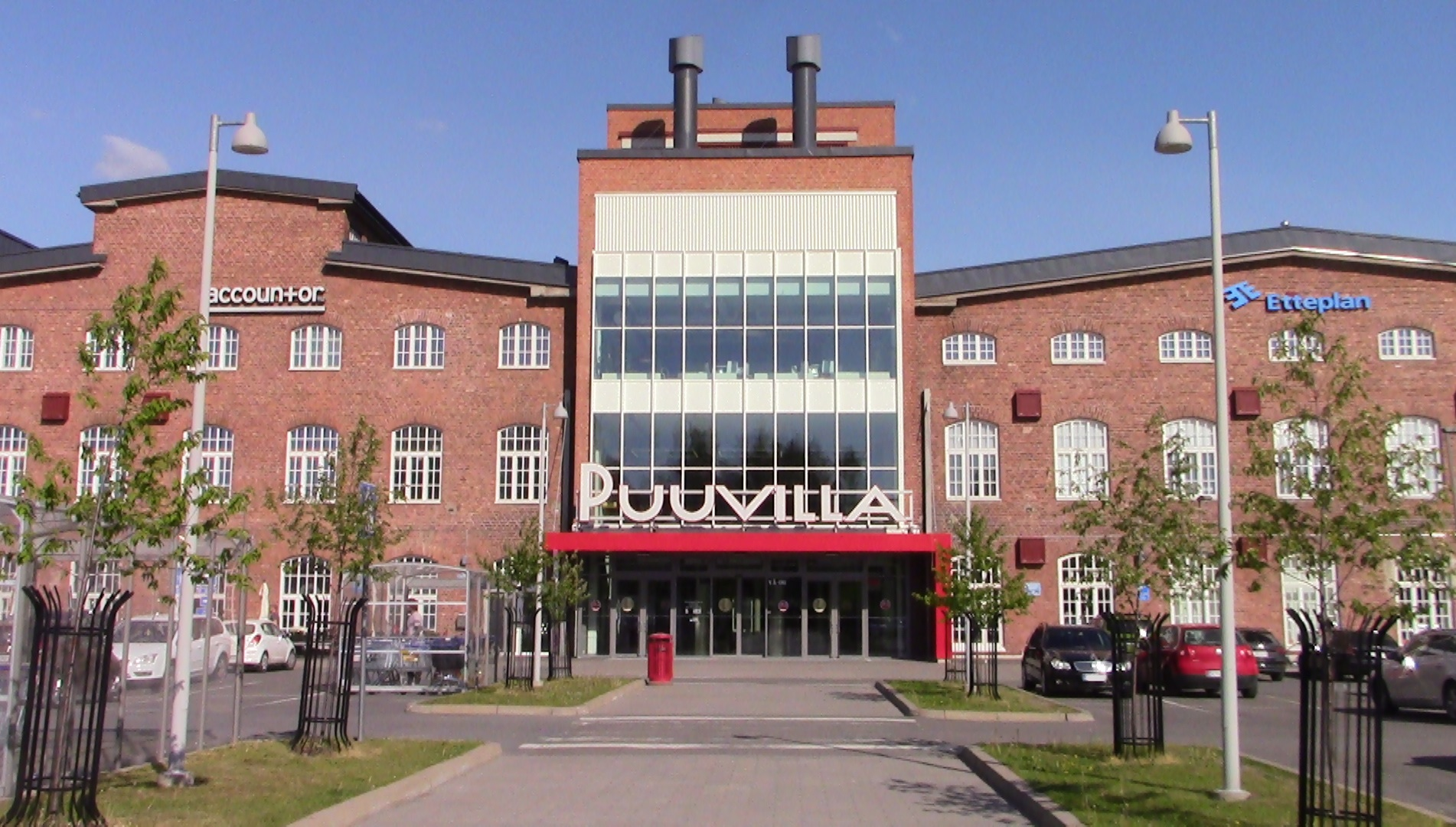
