= Shop drawing =

Technical drawing

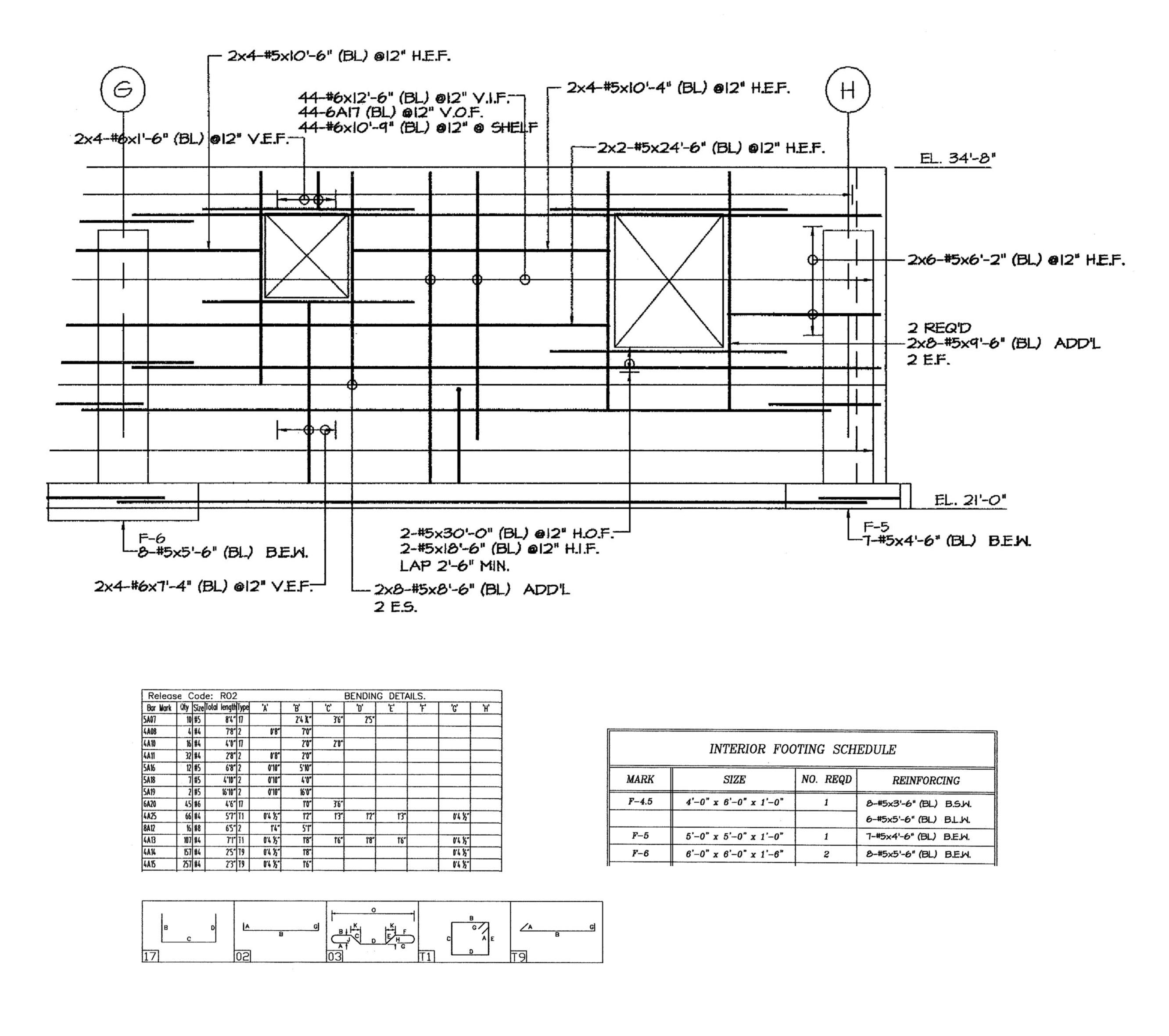
Steel reinforcement for a foundation wall opening. This shop drawing will require the builder and mechanical engineer to specify the opening size for an air-intake and exhaust louvers to be placed in the concrete openings.

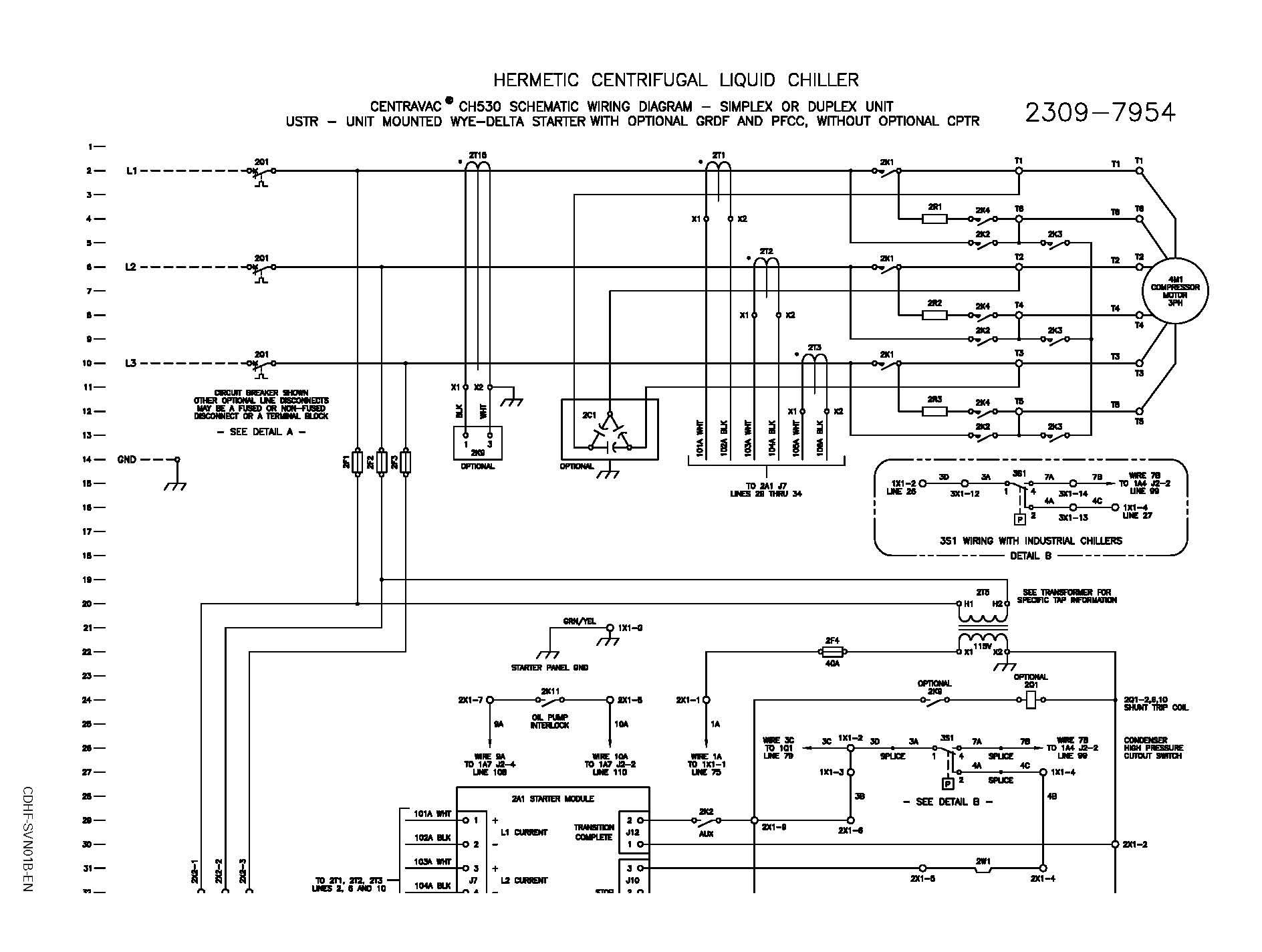
Installation information for electrical connections for chiller unit with surface mounted starter. Installation information will need to be reviewed with electrical and plumbing trades to coordinate third-party service connections.

A shop drawing is a drawing or set of drawings produced by the contractor, supplier, manufacturer, subcontractor, consultants, or fabricator. Shop drawings are typically required for prefabricated components. Examples of these include: elevators, structural steel, trusses, pre-cast concrete, windows, appliances, cabinets, air handling units, and millwork. Also critical are the installation and coordination shop drawings of the MEP trades such as sheet metal ductwork, piping, plumbing, fire protection, and electrical. Shop drawings are produced by contractors and suppliers under their contract with the owner. The shop drawing is the manufacturer’s or the contractor’s drawn version based on the information shown in the construction documents. The shop drawing normally shows more detail than the construction documents. It is drawn to explain the fabrication and/or installation of the items to the manufacturer’s production crew or contractor's installation crews. The style of the shop drawing is usually very different from that of the architect’s drawing. The shop drawing’s primary emphasis is on the particular product or installation and excludes notation concerning other products and installations, unless integration with the subject product is necessary.

== Required information ==
=== Comparison information for the architect and engineer ===
The shop drawings should include information for the architect and engineer to compare to the specifications and drawings. The shop drawing should address the appearance, performance, and prescriptive descriptions in the specifications and construction drawings. The shop drawing often is more detailed than the information shown in the construction documents to give the architect and engineer the opportunity to review the fabricator’s version of the product, prior to fabrication. References to the construction documents, drawings, and specifications assist the architect and engineer in their review of the shop drawings. Attachment of manufacturer’s material specifications, “catalog cut sheets,” and other manufacturer’s information may be helpful to accompany these drawings. Because shop drawings facilitate the architect’s and engineer’s approval of the product, they should be as clear and complete as possible.

=== Notes of changes or alterations from the construction documents ===
Notes concerning changes or differences from the original documents should be made on the shop drawing for the architect’s and engineer’s approval. Ultimately, they are responsible for changes in these drawings and should have the opportunity to analyze any modifications. A dialogue should occur between the fabricator and the architect and engineer about any areas needing clarification. Successful installations are the result of collaboration between the designer, fabricator, and contractor.

=== Information needed to fabricate the product ===
Dimensions, manufacturing conventions, and special fabrication instructions should be included on the shop drawing. It should be clear to fabrication personnel what will be manufactured from the shop drawings alone. The construction documents are rarely used as a reference in fabrication, with the fabricators relying on the shop drawing for all information.

=== Indication of dimensions needing verification from the jobsite ===
Most jobsite dimensions, such as the dimensions between two surfaces on the jobsite, need to be verified. A dimension may be shown on the construction drawings, but the actual dimension may vary, from very small to large increments, depending on jobsite conditions. It is extremely important that the fabricated item arrive on the jobsite ready to be installed without field modification. Special care must be taken by the contractor to measure and verify dimensions. In new construction, plan dimensions usually are sufficient for ordering many fabricated items such as structural steel or precast concrete.

In remodeling and renovation work, it is essential that field dimensions be verified prior to fabrication. Some fabricators, such as cabinet and casework suppliers, prefer not to rely on the contractor’s verification and will verify the dimensions with their own personnel.

millwork and casework, find application in projects including commercial offices, retail stores, parks, hotels, shopping malls, restaurants, upholstery for furniture items, lightings, display counters, racks and shelves, mantelpieces etc.

=== Placement or installation information ===
Some fabricators and manufacturers will provide symbols, data, or instructions concerning installation. This can include a list of other materials, such as fasteners or adhesives, appropriate but not included for the product.

Third party review may be required for major building systems. An example of this would be a commercial chiller which would be furnished by the mechanical contractor, but would require electrical connections, plumbing, rigging, insulation and commissioning. Various third parties will need to review the installation information and confirm they are furnishing compatible equipment and proper layout of services. Review of installation information for major equipment should be reviewed with field supervisors including the project superintendent, trade foremen and field engineer. Installation of major equipment will dictate structural clearances and temporary openings.

=== Samples ===
Some fabrications will require a sample submittal with the shop drawing, primarily for color and texture selection of finishes.

=== Computer-aided mechanical, electrical and plumbing design coordination ===
Problems with design coordination, such as time consumption and ineffectiveness related to the current 2D paper-based process, are some of the top concerns of a general contractor, since late conflict correction increases the potential for errors in the field. In order to address this issue, there have been an increasing number of Architecture, Engineering and Construction (AEC) firms utilizing building information models (BIM) in their coordination and clash detection processes, which according to practitioners, allows for increased coordination and fewer field problems. Leite et al. compared types of clashes identified in a manual coordination process (overlay of 2D drawings on a light table by pairs of subcontractors) and through automatic clash detection using a Building Information Model (BIM). The automatic clash detection identified several clashes that were missed by the subcontractors, who were performing this task manually. Also, the manual clash detection identified clashes which could not possibly be found by the automatic clash detection software, since one of the clashing objects (e.g. cable trays) was not modeled in the BIM. This study also included site observations of field detected clashes, some of which were not identified in either manual or automatic processes. Leite noted that the combination of clashes identified in coordination meetings, those automatically detected, as well as those identified in the field enable identification of objects that need to be modeled in order to capture the largest possible number of clashes. This paper was limited to the comparison of types of clashes identified in each of the three methods during a specific project. Although their results cannot be generalized, they still provide insight towards the need to identify what needs to be modeled in a BIM for MEP coordination prior to the start of the coordination process.

== Reviews ==
Because writing comments on eight to ten copies is a tedious process and an inefficient use of the architect and engineer's time, they will frequently specify other methods for distributing comments. Quick review is essential during the approval process. Any method that facilitates this, while providing ample opportunity for comment and complete distribution, should be considered. Although a procedure may be specified in the contract drawings, most architects and engineers are open to suggestions and innovations that speed up the process.

=== Number of copies ===
Shop drawings are required, in various forms, depending upon the practice of the architect and engineer. A specific number of copies may be required by the specification. An example distribution of the completed and corrected shop drawings may include the:

- Owner—file or inspection copy
- Architect—file copy
- Architect—field copy or inspection copy
- Consulting engineer—file copy
- Consulting engineer—inspection copy
- Contractor—file copy
- Contractor—field copy
- Supplier—original copy or one copy

=== Submittal of one or two copies of the shop drawing ===
Corrections are made by the architect and engineer, and the shop drawing is corrected by the supplier, then the appropriate number of copies is distributed. This method can be time consuming, as the shop drawing is not approved until the corrections are made on it.

=== Submittal of a copy that can be reproduced ===
The architect and engineer make comments on the reproducible, then copies are distributed. This method facilitates the timely approval and distribution of the shop drawing. Review comments usually are obvious on the reproducible copy. When sepia copies are used, the reproduction of the sepia often is not as clear as a normal blue-line print.

=== Compatible CAD software ===
When the supplier and designer have compatible CAD software or when universal file formats such as IFC, PDF or DWG are utilized, the review can be made from a CD, email or FTP transfer. Comments can be made by the designer in a bold font or changes can be boxed for emphasis.

Popular CAD platforms used for generating shop drawings are Advance Steel, AutoCAD, Revit, CATIA, Creo Elements/Pro, Inventor, Solidworks and Tekla Structures.

== Shop drawings in concrete reinforcing ==
Concrete reinforcing is one of the many items requiring specialized shop drawings for the fabrication of the material. Concrete reinforcing is custom-fabricated from 60-foot-long reinforcing bars. The reinforcing bars are cut to length and bent to specific configurations. The shop drawing and the accompanying “cut sheet” lists the quantity, sizes, lengths, and shapes of the reinforcing bar. This information is provided for review by the structural engineer to ensure that sufficient reinforcing is being supplied; fabrication of the bar by the supplier’s shop; an inventory list for the contractor, upon delivery the typical project has thousands of pieces of reinforcing steel that need to be organized for storage and installation; and placement by the ironworker. The Concrete Reinforcing Steel Institute (CRSI) has developed standard symbols, graphics, and formats for shop drawings and cut sheets that generally are used by reinforcing steel fabricators. Each fabricator, has particular style for shop drawings and cut sheets, depending on the drafts people and Computer-aided design systems. Examples of software used are Advance Concrete, AutoCAD, MicroStation, ProConcrete and Tekla Structures.

== See also ==
- Specification (technical standard)
- Technical illustration
