= Drafting machine =

Tool for technical drawing

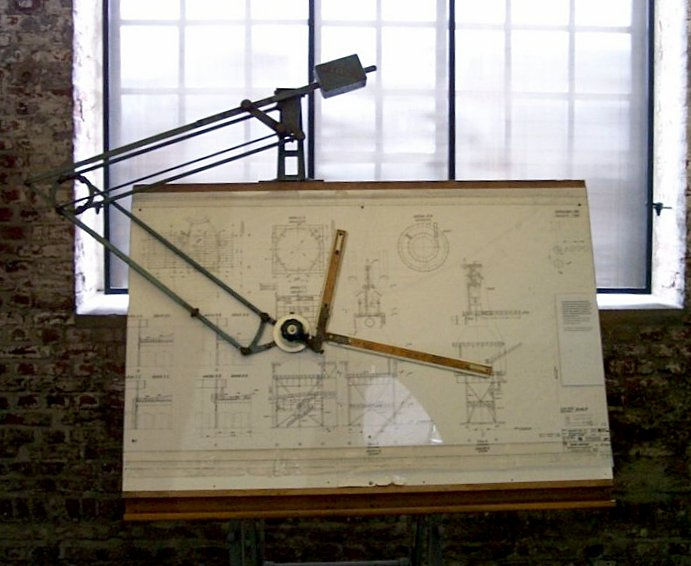
Drafting machine attached to a drawing board

A drafting machine (also drafting arm) is a tool used in technical drawing, consisting of a pair of scales mounted to form a right angle on an articulated protractor head that allows an angular rotation.

The protractor head (two scales and protractor mechanism) is able to move freely across the surface of the drawing board, sliding on two guides directly or indirectly anchored to the drawing board. These guides, which act separately, ensure the movement of the set in the horizontal or vertical direction of the drawing board, and can be locked independently of each other.

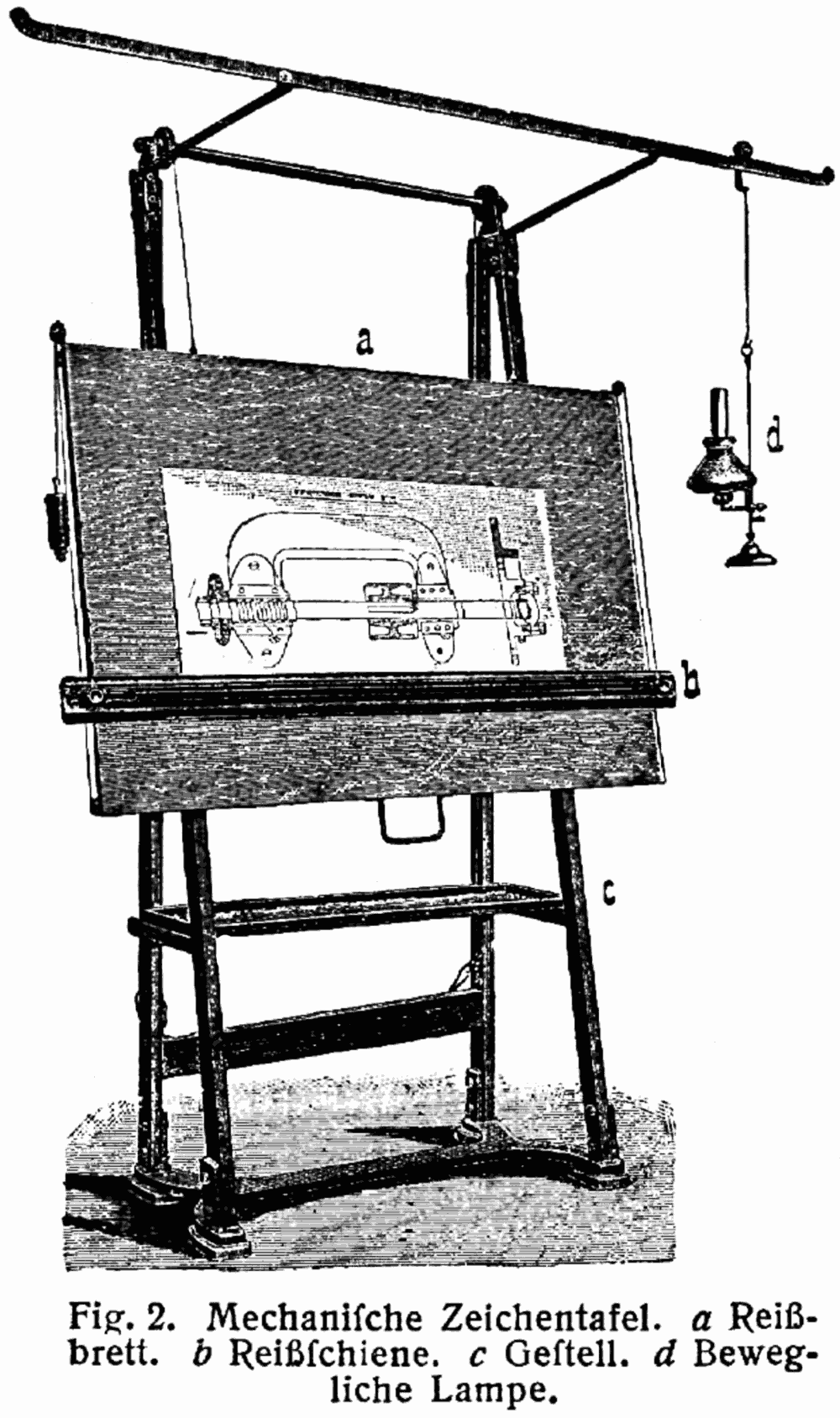
Drawing board with a parallel rule, a precursor to drafting machines

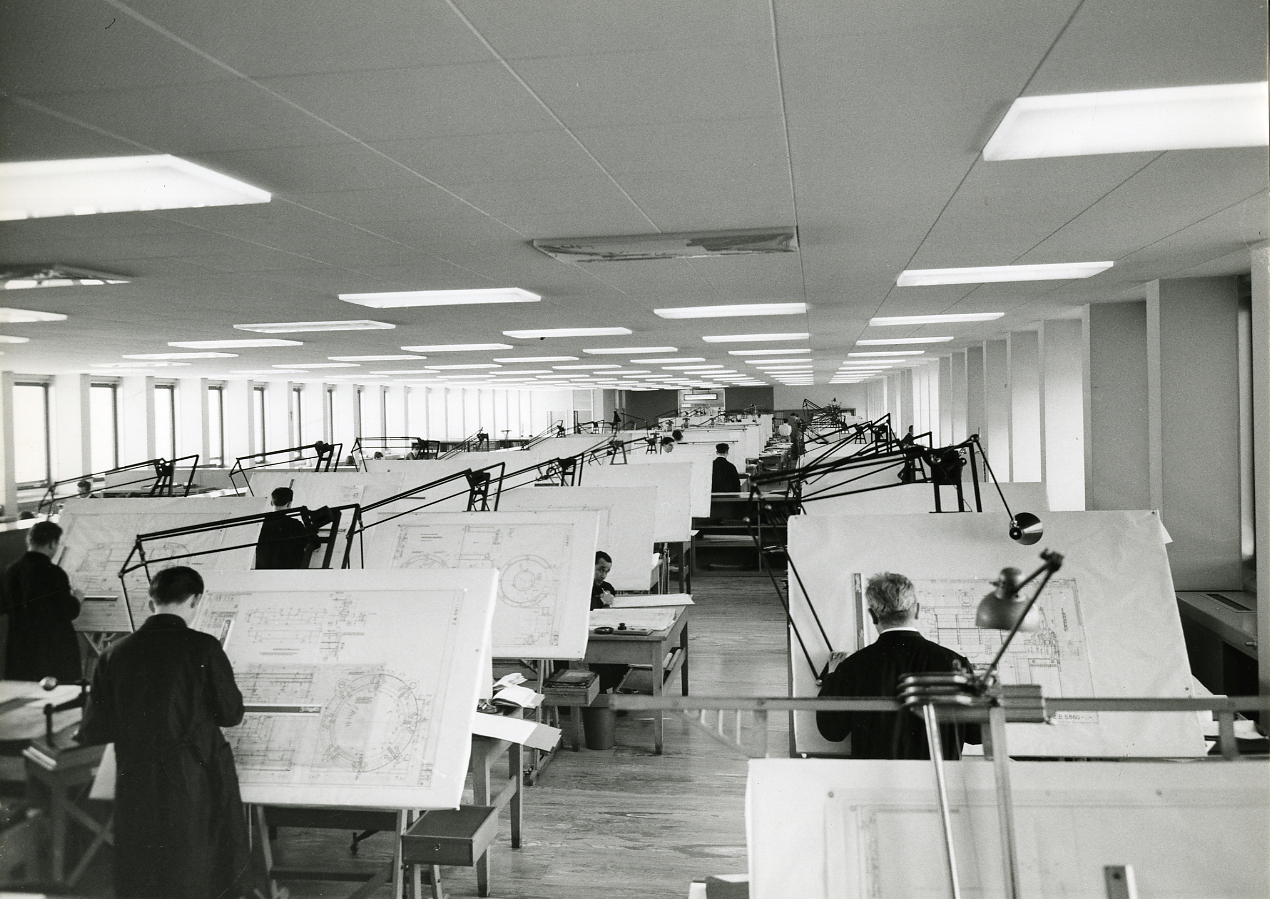
Ercole Marelli offices, Sesto San Giovanni. Photo by Paolo Monti, 1963.

The drafting machine was invented by Charles H. Little in 1901 (U.S. Patent No. 1,081,758), and he founded the Universal Drafting Machine Company in Cleveland, Ohio, to manufacture and sell the instrument.

Drafting machines were present in the design offices of European companies since the 1920s. The Encyclopædia Britannica explicitly specifies 1930 as the year this tool was introduced, but an advertisement of "Memorie di architettura pratica" from 1913 places it twenty years before this date—at least in Italy.

In the older design sets, the movement of the protractor head was assured by a pantograph system that could keep the head in the same angular position throughout its range of motion. The arms were balanced by a system of counterweights or springs.

Typically, the machine is mounted on a drawing board with a hard and smooth surface, anchored to a base that allows its tilting and lifting. Thus, the realization of a drawing can be achieved in the most convenient way on a working surface that can be tilted at any angle from horizontal to vertical.

There are special versions for A0 double-sized boards, to make large drawings, or copying-boards with background illumination, which have all that is necessary to provide specific support.

With the drafting machine one can perform a series of drawing operations that otherwise could only be achieved with a much more complex use of the classic ruler square and protractor, as, for example, drawing parallel lines, orthogonal lines, inclined lines according to a preset angle, measurement of angles, etc.

With the development of computer-aided design (CAD), the use of drafting machines, especially in the professional sector, has drastically declined, supplanted first by pen plotters, and then by large-format inkjet printers.
