= ISO/IEC JTC 1/SC 24 =

Subcommittee of a technical committee

ISO/IEC JTC 1/SC 24 Computer graphics, image processing and environmental data representation is a standardization subcommittee of the joint subcommittee ISO/IEC JTC 1 of the International Organization for Standardization (ISO) and the International Electrotechnical Commission (IEC), which develops and facilitates standards within the field of computer graphics, image processing, and environmental data representation. The international secretariat of ISO/IEC JTC 1/SC 24 is the British Standards Institute (BSI) located in the United Kingdom.

== History ==
ISO/IEC JTC 1/SC 24 was formed in 1987 from ISO/TC 97 as a result of Resolution 21 at the ISO/IEC JTC 1 plenary. The group's origins began in computer graphics, the standardization of which was originally under ISO/IEC JTC 1/SC 21/WG 2. However, when ISO/IEC JTC 1/SC 24 was created, the standardization activity of ISO/IEC JTC 1/SC 21/WG 2 was carried over to the new subcommittee. The initial five working groups of ISO/IEC JTC 1/SC 24 were titled, “Architecture,” “Application programming interfaces,” “Metafiles and interfaces,” “Language bindings,” and “Validation, testing and registration.” The work of ISO/IEC JTC 1/SC 24 began with the Graphical Kernel System (GKS), which was adopted from ISO/IEC JTC 1/SC 21/WG 2. However, since GKS only addressed 2D functionality, attention turned to the standardization of 3D functionality. This resulted in two standards being published: GKS-3D in 1988 and PHIGS in 1989, both of which addressed 3D functionality. Since 1991, ISO/IEC JTC 1/SC 24 has held plenaries in a number of countries, including the Netherlands, Germany, United States, France, Canada, Japan, Sweden, Korea, United Kingdom, Australia, and Czech Republic.

== Scope ==
The scope of ISO/IEC JTC 1/SC 24 is the “Standardization of interfaces for information technology based applications relating to”:

- Computer graphics
- Image processing
- Environmental data representation
- Support for the Mixed and Augmented Reality (MAR)
- Interaction with, and visual representation of, information

Included are the following related areas:

- Modeling and simulation and related reference models
- Virtual reality with accompanying augmented reality/augmented virtuality aspects and related reference models
- Application program interfaces
- Functional specifications
- Representation models
- Interchange formats, encodings and their specifications, including metafiles
- Device interfaces
- Testing methods
- Registration procedures
- Presentation and support for creation of multimedia, hypermedia, and mixed reality documents

Excluded are the following areas:

- Character and image coding
- Coding of multimedia, hypermedia, and mixed reality document interchange formats
- JTC 1 work in user system interfaces and document presentation
- ISO/TC 207 work on ISO 14000 environment management, ISO/TC 211 work on geographic information and geomatics
- Software environments as described by ISO/IEC JTC 1/SC 22

== Structure ==
ISO/IEC JTC 1/SC 24 is made up of four active working groups, each of which carries out specific tasks in standards development within the field of computer graphics, image processing and environmental data representation, together with ITU-T Study Group 16. As a response to changing standardization needs, working groups of ISO/IEC JTC 1/SC 24 can be disbanded if their area of work is no longer applicable, or established if new working areas arise. The focus of each working group is described in the group's terms of reference. Active working groups of ISO/IEC JTC 1/SC 24 are:

Working Group	Working Area
ISO/IEC JTC 1/SC 24/WG 6	Augmented reality continuum presentation and interchange
ISO/IEC JTC 1/SC 24/WG 7	Image processing and interchange
ISO/IEC JTC 1/SC 24/WG 8	Environmental representation
ISO/IEC JTC 1/SC 24/WG 9	Augmented reality continuum concepts and reference model

== Collaborations ==
ISO/IEC JTC 1/SC 24 works in close collaboration with a number of other organizations or subcommittees, both internal and external to ISO or IEC, in order to avoid conflicting or duplicative work. Organizations internal to ISO or IEC that collaborate with or are in liaison to ISO/IEC JTC 1/SC 24 include:

- ISO/IEC JTC 1/WG 7, Sensor Networks
- ISO/IEC JTC 1/SC 29, Coding of audio, picture, multimedia and hypermedia information
- ISO/IEC JTC 1/SC 32, Data management and interchange
- ISO/TAG 14, Imagery and technology
- ISO/TC 130, Graphic Technology
- ISO/TC 184/SC 4, Industrial data
- ISO/TC 211, Geographic information/Geomatics
- ISO/TC 215, Health informatics
- IEC TC 100, Audio, video and multimedia system and equipment

Some organizations external to ISO or IEC that collaborate with or are in liaison to ISO/IEC JTC 1/SC 24 include:

- Defence Geospatial Information Working Group (DGIWG)
- Digital Imaging and Communications in Medicine (DICOM)
- International Hydrographic Organization (IHO)
- The Khronos Group
- NATO - Joint Intelligence Surveillance and Reconnaissance Capability Group (JISRCG)
- OMG Robotics DTF
- Open CGM
- Open Geospatial Consortium (OGC)
- SEDRIS Organization
- Simulation Interoperability Standards Organization (SISO)
- US National Imagery Transmission Format Standard (NITFS) Technical Board (US NTB)
- Web3D Consortium
- World Intellectual Property Organization (WIPO)
- World Wide Web Consortium (W3C)

== Member countries ==
Countries pay a fee to ISO to be members of subcommittees.

The 11 "P" (participating) members of ISO/IEC JTC 1/SC 24 are: Australia, China, Egypt, France, India, Japan, Republic of Korea, Portugal, Russian Federation, United Kingdom, and United States.

The 22 "O" (observer) members of ISO/IEC JTC 1/SC 24 are: Argentina, Austria, Belgium, Bosnia and Herzegovina, Bulgaria, Canada, Cuba, Czech Republic, Finland, Ghana, Hungary, Iceland, Indonesia, Islamic Republic of Iran, Italy, Kazakhstan, Malaysia, Poland, Romania, Serbia, Slovakia, Switzerland, and Thailand.

== Published standards ==
ISO/IEC JTC 1/SC 24 currently has 80 published standards under their direct responsibility within the field of computer graphics, image processing, and environmental data representation, including:

ISO/IEC Standard	Title	Status	Description	WG
ISO/IEC 11072 free	Information technology – Computer graphics – Computer Graphics Reference Model	Published (1992)	Defines a set of concepts and their inter-relationships, which should be applicable to the complete range of future computer graphics standards	
ISO/IEC 7942-1	Information technology – Computer graphics and image processing – Graphical Kernel System (GKS) – Part 1: Functional description	Published (1994)	“Specifies a set of functions for computer graphics programming, Graphical Kernel System. Provides functions for two dimensional graphical output, the storage and dynamic modification of pictures, and operator input.”	6 (Maintenance)
ISO/IEC 8805	Information processing systems – Computer graphics – Graphical Kernel System for Three Dimensions (GKS-3D) functional description	Published (1988)	Specifies the GKS-3D as the basic graphics system of computer-generated three dimensional pictures on graphics output devices	6 (Maintenance)
ISO/IEC 9592-1	Information technology – Computer graphics and image processing – Programmer's Hierarchical Interactive Graphics System (PHIGS) – Part 1: Functional description	Published (1997)	Specifies a set of functions for computer graphics programming, PHIGS, which is a graphics system for application programs that produce computer generated pictures on output devices	6 (Maintenance)
ISO/IEC 9593-1	Information processing systems – Computer graphics – Programmer's Hierarchical Interactive Graphics System (PHIGS) language bindings – Part 1: FORTRAN	Published (1990)	“Specifies the FORTRAN language dependent layer.”	6 (Maintenance)
ISO/IEC 8632-1 free	Information technology – Computer graphics – Metafile for the storage and transfer of picture description information – Part 1: Functional specification	Published (1999)	Provides a file format that is suitable for the storage and retrieval of picture description information; consists of an ordered set of elements that may be used to describe pictures in a way that is compatible between systems of different architectures, compatible with devices of differing capabilities and design, and meaningful to application constituencies.	6 (Maintenance)
ISO/IEC 14772-1	Information technology – Computer graphics and image processing – The Virtual Reality Modeling Language (VRML) – Part 1: Functional specification and UTF-8 encoding	Published (1997)	Defines a file format that integrates 3D graphics and multimedia	6 (Maintenance)
ISO/IEC 19774	Information technology – Computer graphics and image processing – Humanoid Animation (H-Anim)	Published (2006)	Specifies the structure and parametrization of articulable humanoid characters	6
ISO/IEC 19775-1	Information technology – Computer graphics, image processing and environmental data representation – Extensible 3D (X3D) – Part 1: Architecture and base components	Published (2013)	Specifies the abstract functionality of X3D including base functionality and forty-one components; not only includes functionality, but also specifies support layers for each component and profiles that collect component support layers as needed for specific vertical applications	6
ISO/IEC 19775-2	Information technology – Computer graphics and image processing – Extensible 3D (X3D) – Part 2: Scene access interface (SAI)	Published (2010)	Specifies a set of services that allow internal or external code to interact with an X3D scene graph; internal interactions occur using the X3D Script node, while external applications interact through function calls	6
ISO/IEC 19776-1	Information technology – Computer graphics, image processing and environmental data representation – Extensible 3D (X3D) encodings – Part 1: Extensible Markup Language (XML) encoding	Published (2009)	Specifies XML encoding for the X3D scene graph	6
ISO/IEC 19776-2	Information technology – Computer graphics, image processing and environmental data representation – Extensible 3D (X3D) encodings – Part 2: Classic VRML encoding	Published (2008)	Specifies an encoding of X3D scene graphs that uses the technique used for VRML	6
ISO/IEC 19776-3	Information technology – Computer graphics, image processing and environmental data representation – Extensible 3D (X3D) encodings – Part 3: Compressed binary encoding	Published (2011)	Specifies a FasInfoSet-based binary encoding of the X3D scene graph	6
ISO/IEC 19777-1	Information technology – Computer graphics and image processing – Extensible 3D (X3D) language bindings – Part 1: ECMAScript	Published (2006)	Specifies a language-dependent layer, in which the X3D abstract interfaces are embedded in, for the ECMAScript language	6
ISO/IEC 19777-2	Information technology – Computer graphics and image processing – Extensible 3D (X3D) language bindings – Part 2: Java	Published (2006)	Specifies a language-dependent layer in which the X3D abstract interfaces are embedded in, for the Java language	6
ISO/IEC 12087-1	Information technology – Computer graphics and image processing – Image Processing and Interchange (IPI) – Functional specification – Part 1: Common architecture for imaging	Published (1995)	Defines a generic, unifying imaging architecture and those specializations and delineations of the generic imaging architecture required to support IPI-PIKS and IPI-IIF	7
ISO/IEC 12087-2	Information technology – Computer graphics and image processing – image processing and interchange (IPI) – Functional specification – Part 2: Programmer's imaging kernel system application programme interface	Published (1994)	Programmer's Imaging Kernel System (PIKS) provides a rich set of application program interfaces (APIs) for image processing services on image and image-derived data objects	7
ISO/IEC 12087-3	Information technology – Computer graphics and image processing—Image Processing and Interchange (IPI) – Functional specification – Part 3: Image Interchange Facility (IIF)	Published (1995); Amended (1996)	Defines the image interchanging functions and is used as a reference for imaging applications environments or among imaging devices	7
ISO/IEC 12087-5	Information technology – Computer graphics and image processing – Image Processing and Interchange (IPI) – Functional specification – Part 5: Basic Image Interchange Format (BIIF)	Published (1998)	Provides a foundation for interoperability in the interchange of imagery and imagery-related data among applications such as JPEG 2000 and the CGM format	7
ISO/IEC 12088-4	Information technology – Computer graphics and image processing – Image processing and interchange – Application program interface language bindings	Published (1995)	Specifies APIs of the PIKS and IIF defined in ISO/IEC 12087-2 and ISO/IEC 12087-3, in the programming language C	7
ISO/IEC 9973	Information Technology – Computer graphics, image processing and environmental data representation – Procedure for registration of items	Published (1994); Amended (2013)	Specifies the procedures to be followed in preparing, maintaining and publishing a registrar of identifiers and meaning that, under the direction of ISO/IEC JTC 1/SC 24, are assigned to graphical items	7 and 8
ISO/IEC 18023-1 free	Information technology – SEDRIS – Part 1: Functional specification	Published (2006)	Specifies: a data representation model for expressing environmental data; specifications of the data types and classes that together constitute the data representation model; an application program interface that supports the storage and retrieval of environmental data using the data representation model	8
ISO/IEC 18024-4	Information technology – SEDRIS language bindings – Part 4: C	Published (2006)	Specifies the C binding language for SEDRIS Part 1	8
ISO/IEC 18025	Information technology – Environmental Data Coding Specification (EDCS)	Published (2005)	Establishes the mechanisms to ensure that environmental information is: unambiguously defined; flexibly denoted and encoded, and; easily bound in exchange format and to programming languages	8
ISO/IEC 18026	Information technology – Spatial Reference Model (SRM)	Published (2009)	Supports unambiguous specification of the positions, directions, distances and times associated with spatial information; defines an algorithm for the precise transformation positions, directions and distances among different spatial reference frames	8
ISO/IEC 18041-4	Information technology – Computer graphics, image processing and environmental data representation – Environmental Data Coding Specification (EDCS) language bindings – Part 4: C	Published (2016)	Defines a standard binding for the C computer programming language for ISO/IEC 18025 (EDCS)	8
ISO/IEC 18042-4	Information technology – Computer graphics and image processing – Spatial Reference Model (SRM) language bindings – Part 4: C	Published (2006)	Defines a standard binding for the C computer programming language for ISO/IEC 18026 (SRM)	8

== See also ==
- ISO/IEC JTC 1
- List of ISO standards
- British Standards Institute
- International Organization for Standardization
- International Electrotechnical Commission
- SEDRIS
- X3D
