= Tony Parisi (software developer) =

Software developer

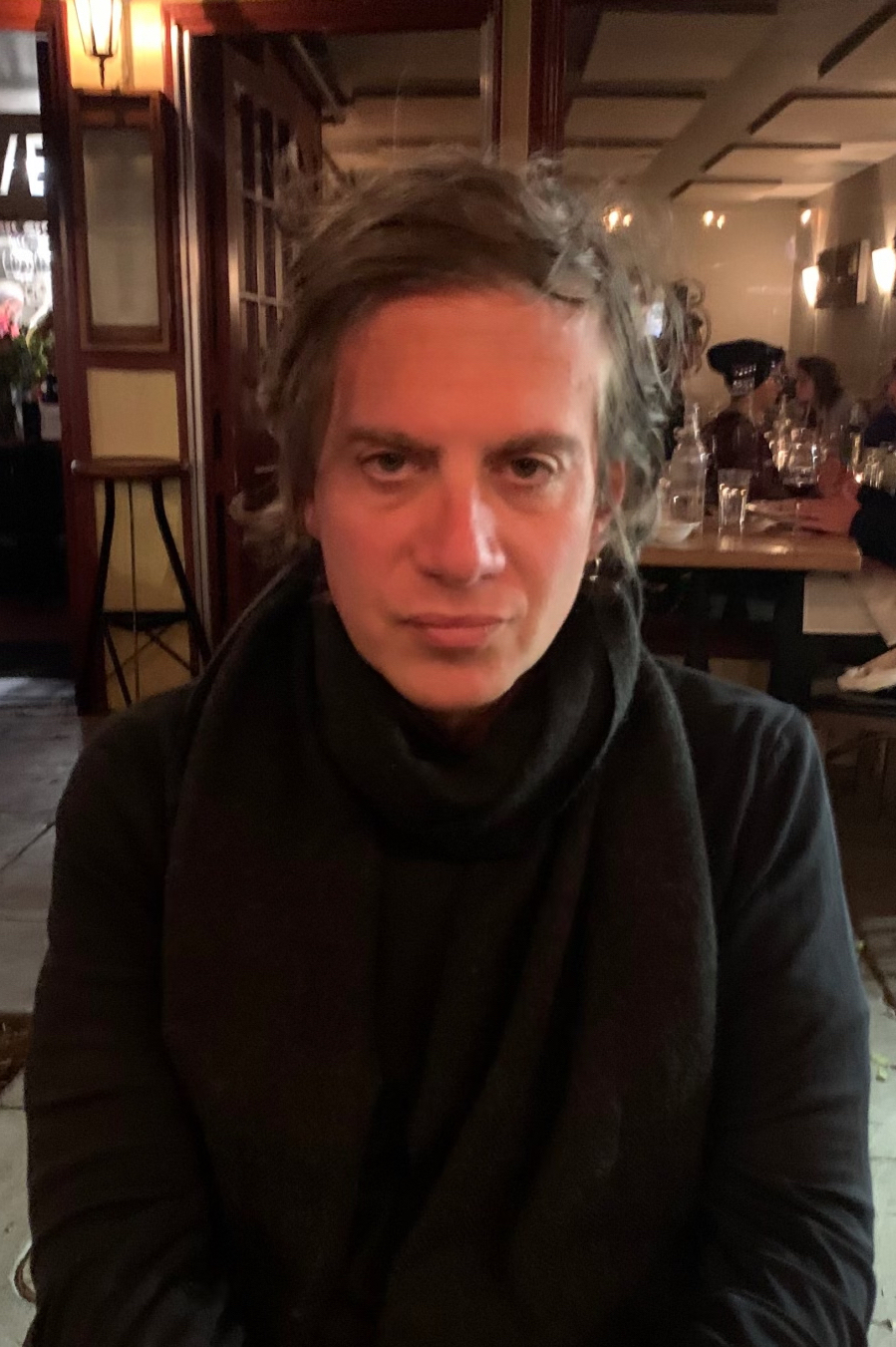
- Parisi in 2022
- Born: Anthony Parisi; December 1, 1962 (age 63)
- Education: University of Massachusetts Boston; Berklee College of Music
- Occupations: Software developer, inventor, entrepreneur
- Years active: 1990-present
- Known for: International standards, 3D graphics, virtual reality
- Website: tonyparisi.com

Tony Parisi is an entrepreneur, inventor and developer of 3D computer software. The co-creator of Virtual Reality Modeling Language (VRML), he has written books and papers on the future of technology. He works on WebGL and WebVR and has written two books on the former, and an introductory book on virtual reality programming. He is the chief strategy officer at Lamina1. Parisi is also a musician, composer and producer working on multiple projects.

== Career ==
Parisi has designed and developed several international 3D graphics standards. Parisi worked with Mark Pesce to develop VRML, which Pesce presented to the world in 1994. The purpose of VRML was to allow for the creation of 3-D environments within the World Wide Web, accessible through a web browser. Parisi worked with such corporations as Microsoft, Netscape, Silicon Graphics, Sun Microsystems and Sony to gain industry acceptance of the new protocol as a standard for desktop virtual reality. In his early career Parisi worked as a software engineer in Cambridge, MA. From 1987 to 1990 Parisi was at Bolt, Beranek and Newman, developing scientific and statistical analysis software and managing projects to port products to early graphical user interface systems.

From 1990 to 1991 Parisi was a senior software engineer at spreadsheet pioneer Lotus Development Corporation, where he worked on X, Windows and Macintosh versions of Lotus 1-2-3. In 1991 he co-founded Belmont Research with BBN alumni, where he created a scientific and statistical analysis software toolkit and wrote the compiler and runtime graphics and user interface libraries for BTL, the company’s domain-specific language for application developers. Parisi was a founding member of the Web3D Consortium, an organization focused on encouraging development and implementation of open standards for three-dimensional content and services. He was one of the original designers and specification editors of X3D, an upgrade to VRML which extended its features and added format encodings in XML, compressed binary and JSON.

=== Intervista Software 1995-1999 ===
In 1995 Parisi founded Intervista Software, one of the first startups devoted to creating products for creating and viewing VRML content. Parisi developed WorldView, the first PC-based VRML web browser plugin for PCs. In 1997 Parisi licensed WorldView to Microsoft for distribution in the Internet Explorer web browser as its built-in VRML viewer solution, distributed to tens of millions of Windows users. Intervista was sold to Platinum Technology in 1999, where Parisi served as VP of Business Development through 2000.

=== Media Machines/Vivaty 2003-2010 ===
After a period of independent consulting, Parisi founded Media Machines in 2003 to focus on X3D-based software and products. The company developed the Flux Player browser plugin and Flux Editor for creating 3D scenes and experiences. In 2008 the company raised investment from Silicon Valley venture investors to create an in-browser virtual world platform with a player, server, and creation tools based on the Flux Player and Flux Editor, and rebranded the company as Vivaty. Vivaty was purchased by Microsoft in 2010.

=== 2012-2023 ===
In 2012, Parisi joined the Khronos working group creating glTF, a JSON- and binary-encoded file format for three-dimensional scenes and models intended for web and mobile applications. He served as glTF specification co-editor from 2012 to 2017, and contributed technical features such as the design of the original animation system. Parisi also wrote the initial file loader for Three.js, and the first sample exporter to glTF from the Unity game-engine editor. Parisi coined the name “glTF” (Graphics Language Transmission Format) as an alternative to the generic working title “ATF” (Asset Transmission Format), which the working group accepted. Parisi was also instrumental in getting the format adopted by companies such as Oculus and Microsoft in 2016, which helped propel the format into wide use and industry acceptance.

With the rise of consumer virtual reality and in the wake of Facebook’s acquisition of Oculus, Parisi advised several startup companies and became a public speaker and consultant.

In 2016 Parisi joined San Francisco-based Unity Technologies as Global Head of VR/AR, and served in that position until early 2022. Over time his role shifted from overseeing all virtual and augmented reality strategy for the company to developing strategy and products that integrate virtual and augmented reality with advertising and e-commerce. While at Unity, Parisi filed and was granted a patent for an invention in augmented reality advertising.

In October 2021, Parisi published a treatise titled “The Seven Rules of the Metaverse,” which went viral and has since become a de facto work in Metaverse canon. Parisi is the co-host with Mark Pesce of the podcast “A Brief History of the Metaverse.” In 2022 Parisi joined as Chief Strategy Officer at Seattle-based LAMINA1, a blockchain and Metaverse startup co-founded by author Neal Stephenson.

=== 2023-present ===
In July 2023, Parisi founded Metatron Studio as a content studio for the Metaverse, focused on entertainment projects that integrate music, live theater, computer graphics, virtual and augmented reality and blockchain technology. Parisi, also a Berklee College of Music alumnus, launched multiple NFT collections based on his original music.

In May 2023 he released the NFT for Cradle to Grave, a protest song about gun violence and reproductive rights in the US. In July 2023, Parisi launched the NFT collection for Judgment Day, Parisi's original rock opera about the end of the world. The cast recording was published on major streaming music services in late 2022. Parisi is using a portion of the proceeds from the Judgment Day NFT collection to fund development of the live show, and has publicly stated that he will remove the music for Judgment Day from streaming services once the collection sells out, offering access to the music to NFT and live show ticket holders.

=== Authorship ===
From 2011 through 2014, Parisi wrote books, created training courses and consulted to companies on WebGL, the standard JavaScript API for rendering interactive 2D and 3D graphics in web browsers. Parisi authored two O’Reilly Media books on WebGL programming. Parisi authored an introductory book on virtual reality programming published by O’Reilly Media in 2015.

== Bibliography ==
- WebGL: Up and Running (O'Reilly Media, 2012)
- Programming 3D Applications with HTML5 and WebGL: 3D Animation and Visualization for Web Pages (O'Reilly Media, 2014)
- Learning Virtual Reality (O'Reilly Media, 2015)

== See also ==
- Flux (software)
- X3D
- WebGL
