= OpenVRML =

- Original author: Chris Morley
- Developer: Braden McDaniel
- Stable release: 0.18.6
- Written in: C++
- Operating system: Linux, FreeBSD, Mac OS X
- Type: VRML, X3D
- License: GNU Lesser General Public License
- Website: http://www.openvrml.org

OpenVRML is a free and open-source software project that makes it possible to view three-dimensional objects in the VRML and X3D formats in Internet-based applications. The software was initially developed by Chris Morley; since 2000 the project has been led by Braden McDaniel.

OpenVRML provides a GTK+-based plugin to render VRML and X3D worlds in web browsers. Its libraries can be used to add VRML and X3D support to applications. The software is licensed under the terms of the GNU Lesser General Public License (LGPL) and distributed a GNU-style source package that is portable to most POSIX systems with a C++ compiler. The source distribution also includes project files for building on Microsoft Windows with the freely-available Visual C++ Express compiler.

Binary (compiled) versions of the software are available within the Linux distributions Fedora and Debian, as well as under FreshPorts for FreeBSD and Fink for Mac OS X.

A number of software applications are designed to generate VRML code; see for instance GNU Octave.
