= VREAM =

Software company

VREAM, Inc.
- Type: Private
- Industry: Software
- Founded: 1991
- Defunct: November 1, 1996
- Fate: Acquired by Platinum Technology Inc.
- Successor: Platinum Technology
- Headquarters: Chicago, Illinois, United States
- Key people: Edward R. LaHood (Founder and CEO); Ken Gaebler (Co-Founder); Dan Malven (Co-Founder)

VREAM, Inc. was a US technology company that functioned between 1991 and 1996. It was one of the first companies to develop PC-based software for authoring and viewing virtual reality (VR) environments.

== Company history ==
The company was founded in Chicago in 1991 by former McKinsey & Company consultant Edward R. LaHood, who derived the name VREAM from the phrase "virtual reality dream." LaHood was joined by co-founders Ken Gaebler. and Dan Malven in 1993.

In 1991, LaHood created VREAMScript, a scripting language for virtual reality environments that allowed for the definition of complex 3D objects, environment attributes, object attributes, and triggers for cause-and-effect relationships. The company then created a PC-based authoring tool, the VREAM Virtual Reality Development System, to build virtual reality environments and an accompanying runtime player, the VREAM Runtime System, that allowed end users to experience the virtual environments, moving through them in real-time while interacting with the rendered, virtual objects.

The VREAM Virtual Reality System, which included the VREAM Virtual Reality Development System and the VREAM Runtime System, was released for purchase in December, 1992, with a $1,495 price point and with support for a wide range of immersive devices, including the Power Glove.

== Initial Impact ==
Prior to 1992, rendering real-time 3D graphics had only been possible on high-end workstations, and creating a real-time 3D graphics simulation required strong programming skills. The growing power of PCs, driven by such innovations as the Pentium chip (introduced by Intel in March 1993), made bringing virtual reality simulations to the PC a possibility, and LaHood's strong programming skills allowed him to be first to market with a PC-based virtual reality authoring solution that could be used by non-programmers. (LaHood was not, however, the first to bring virtual reality to the PC; that credit goes to Sense8 founders Patrice Gelband and Eric Gullichsen who, earlier in 1992, introduced WorldToolKit, a VR programmer's library that allowed developers to build "virtual world" applications that ran on desktop computers.)

Due to its accessibility to non-programmers and those who could not afford high-end workstations, VREAM's software quickly became popular in the hobbyist virtual reality community. It was used for architectural walkthroughs, manufacturing training, game development, engineering prototyping, data visualization and other simulations. The software was even used in the treatment of fear of public speaking, acrophobia and male erectile disorder.

In addition to its software offerings, the company also provided virtual reality development services. A notable services client was Burger King, which hired VREAM to build a "restaurant of the future" for its franchisee conference. VREAM also created virtual reality product demonstrations for Bombardier Recreational Products for their Sea-Doo and Ski-Doo lines.

== Web-Based VR ==
In 1994, based on the emergence of the World Wide Web and at the suggestion of co-founder Malven, the company recast its runtime player as a plug-in for Netscape Navigator, dubbing it WIRL. VREAM would later release WIRL as an ActiveX control for Microsoft Internet Explorer.

At a time when web-based software was in its earliest stages, WIRL was quite popular, ranking fourth on the list of downloaded software, surpassed only by Netscape Navigator, MPEG Player NET TOOB and HTML editor HotDog Pro. Within the first month of being available, WIRL was downloaded over 30,000 times, providing VREAM with a very efficient way to promote its software.

WIRL was also used by PC Magazine to test the capabilities of PC graphics cards. Bill Gates, CEO of Microsoft, and Craig Barrett, of Intel, used WIRL demonstrations in their keynote speeches to showcase the potential of more powerful PCs.

In November 1994, VRML, a standard file format for representing Web-based, real-time interactive 3D environments, was introduced. The introduction of VRML, backed by SGI and other companies, lessened the future potential of VREAM's proprietary VREAMScript language. To mitigate its risks, VREAM adopted the approach of supporting both VRML and VREAMScript in its software products.

In May 1995, VREAM rebranded the next generation of its VR authoring software as VRCreator, and touted its support for "multi-participant VR...across the World Wide Web."

== Venture Capital Funding ==
In November 1995, based on the company's track record and based on growing interest in the venture capital community for Web-focused software companies, VREAM received $750,000 in venture funding from PLATINUM Venture Partners. At this time, co-founder Malven left to pursue other opportunities.

== Competition ==
VREAM's primary competitor in its earliest days was Sense8 Corp. of Sausalito, Calif., which offered a virtual reality programming toolkit for the PC.

By March 1995, however, the VR space was getting crowded, with many authoring tools on the market, including VREAM's VRCreator, Virtus VR, Virtus Walkthrough Pro, and Superscape VRT.

As virtual reality grabbed market attention, a number of new competitors emerged, including Paper Software (founded by Mike McCue), Intervista (founded by Tony Parisi) and Silicon Graphics.

== Company Sale ==
After Netscape acquired Paper Software in February 1996 for $20 million, VREAM hired an investment banker to sell the company.

While working to sell the company, VREAM continued to work on the next generation of its VRML authoring and browsing software. After releasing a new version, the company's VRML browser, WIRL, received the PC Magazine Editor's Choice award in November 1996.

In that same month, November 1996, VREAM was acquired by PLATINUM Technology, Inc. for $10.3 million and became a business unit within PLATINUM.

As the World Wide Web's popularity grew, creating many opportunities for tech companies, interest in VR and VRML quickly faded and many VR companies struggled. The VREAM division of PLATINUM Technology acquired Intervista and the assets of SGI's VR division. PLATINUM Technology deployed VREAM's virtual reality software in some of its enterprise software products, but closed down the VREAM business unit just prior to the acquisition of PLATINUM Technology by Computer Associates in 1999. VREAM co-founders Gaebler and LaHood left PLATINUM at that time and started a new venture, BeautyJunglecom, selling cosmetics online.

The closing down of PLATINUM's VREAM Division marked a turning point for the VR industry, which had experienced a flurry of interest, activity and investment during the nineties. Interest in VR would be mostly dormant for the next fifteen years, at which point virtual reality technology company Oculus VR would be acquired by Facebook for US$2 billion in cash and Facebook stock, shocking many VR veterans of the nineties and stimulating significant interest in virtual reality from a new generation of entrepreneurs.
