= 3DXML =

3D file format

- Internet media type: application/x-3dxmlplugin
- Developed by: Dassault Systèmes
- Extended from: XML
- Open format?: No

3DXML is a proprietary 3D file format developed by Dassault Systèmes under its 3DVIA Brand. It uses an XML container whose specifications were published. It should not be confused with X3D, the ISO standard XML-based file format for representing 3D computer graphics.

The 3DXML file is a zip archive file that contains a BOM file and one or more 3D representation files. Renaming the file from .3dxml to .zip allows a program like WinZip to open the archive.

The 3DXML file can contain 3D representation files stored in either XML or binary format and they can contain either surface data, as a mesh that can be interpreted as surface data or as a simple mesh.

The surface data is stored as Gregory patches.

The "surface" mesh (containing topology, faces, edges, vertices, and rounding weights) can be reinterpreted back into a surface by a compliant 3DXML viewer.

The simple mesh is tessellated data stored as triangles. trifans, and trisets.

== Support ==
Up to this date the 3DXML format is only supported by Dassault Systèmes product line. The 3D XML Player is a standalone application that allows you to view 3D XML files on Windows. The 3DVIA Player, a free player available on the Windows platform (OSX No longer supported), allows to view 3D XML files in a web browser, offline or online.

== License ==
Dassault Systèmes provides a yearly royalty free license to anyone requesting the 3DXML format documentation. This license however only permits internal works.

== See also ==
- 3DML
- 3DMLW
- List of vector graphics markup languages
- glTF - a Khronos Group file format for 3D Scenes and models.
