= Blaxxun =

Defunct dotcom bubble VR company

Blaxxun Interactive
- Type: Private company
- Founded: August 1995
- Founder: Franz Buchenberger; Bernd-Michael Habermeyer; Bob Rockwell; Peter Graf; Rainer Heigenmoser; Kristof Nast-Kolb; Robert Schöller; Thilo Schwerdfeger
- Defunct: 2002
- Headquarters: San Francisco, US
- Area served: Global
- Products: Software
- Number of employees: 130 (in 2000)

Blaxxun Interactive, originally named "Black Sun Interactive", was one of the first companies to develop a 3D community platform designed for the Internet using VRML and highly scalable multi-user server environments.

== Company history ==
Blaxxun was founded in August 1995 with its sales/marketing offices in San Francisco, CA and management/development in Munich, Germany. Blaxxun was funded by the US venture capital company CMGI, in the same portfolio as leading Internet companies like GeoCities and Lycos. Later blaxxun investors included tbg and General Electric.

Blaxxun developed various 3D browsers and multi-user server platforms. Customers included BMW ("3D Car Configurator"), Deutsche Bank ("Virtual Shareholder Meeting"), IBM (3D Notebook Demo), Canal+ ("Virtual Paris"), Siemens, Intel, and many other major brands.

In 1996, Blaxxun acquired Cybertown, a US-based community and evolved it into a 3D community that attracted more than 1 million registered users by 2000. blaxxun also established joint ventures with Germany's leading publisher Cornelsen (3D community Learnetix) and the soccer community SoccerCity (in collaboration with Kicker magazine).

In 2000, Blaxxun was scheduled for an IPO at Germany's Neuer Markt. The IPO was delayed and finally failed in August 2000, when the Internet boom turned into the dot-com bubble. blaxxun's IPO consortium banks had a public disagreement about the cancellation, as the IPO was oversubscribed by a factor of 2.5 on the institutional side. In 2001, blaxxun became shortly profitable and succeeded in raising more funding, but then was also hit by collapsing Internet revenues.

In early 2002, Blaxxun went out of business. Some assets were taken over by successor companies.

Blaxxun Technologies continued to market the core server technologies. Bitmanagement Software continued to develop the 3D client. Cybertown was given back to the founders and was later sold.

== See also ==
- Active Worlds
- Flux (software)
- Seamless3d
- Second Life
- Simulated reality
- X3D
