= Tony Parisi =

Tony Parisi may refer to:

- Tony Parisi (wrestler) (1941–2000), birth name Antonio Pugliese, Italian wrestler
- Tony Parisi (software developer)
