= Mortalus: The Quest for Immortality =

1997 video game

- Developers: Hoffman & Associates Entertainment
- Publishers: Hoffman & Associates Entertainment
- Platforms: Microsoft Windows, Macintosh
- Release: 1997
- Genre: Adventure
- Mode: Single-player

Mortalus: The Quest for Immortality is a 1997 video game by Canadian studio Hoffman & Associates Entertainment for Microsoft Windows and Macintosh. It is an adventure video game in which players must locate a chalice to obtain immortality and defeat the cultist Dark Brotherhood. Until 2000, it featured a web component where visiting the game's website allowed the player to download files to access new areas. Upon release, Mortalus received negative reviews, with critics praising its visuals, but faulting its gameplay, performances, puzzles, and web integration.

== Gameplay ==
Gameplay screenshot

Mortalus is an adventure video game in which players use point-and-click controls to navigate through still scenes. Players explore the game's environments to locate objects to allow access to the next area, and complete logic puzzles. The game features a web component where players can log into the official website to download additional content to access new areas in the game, by using VRML files. The game's website functionality was discontinued in 2000.

== Plot ==
The player is the squire of a noble lord, Sir John of Harrow, riding upon an abandoned castle. The player's lord instructs the player that he is there to meet the head of a devoted order named the Dark Brotherhood, attended to by the Servants of the Hand. After Sir John leaves to meet them, the player meets Peter, a former novice of the Brotherhood. Peter says that Sir John is in fact aiming to join the Brotherhood and the player has been marked to die. To escape this fate, John tasks the player to read the Dark Book of Knowledge to locate the Chalice, which can grant them immortality and the power to defeat the Brotherhood.

== Reception ==
Reception

Review scores
Publication	Score
AllGame	2.5
Computer Games Strategy Plus	2/5
Mac Gamers' Ledge	2/5
Ultimate PC	39%

Expressing that the game was "short, simple and uninspired", John Altman of Computer Games Strategy Plus praised the visuals, but critiqued the game's "comically bad" action sequences, "god-awful" dialogue and "mediocre" video. Despite praising the graphics of Mortalus, Sage Friedman of Mac Gamers' Ledge did not recommend the game, considering the plot to be "ugly" and "cliche-ridden", as well as its combat and live-action performances. Ultimate PC similarly critiqued the game's "pathetic" battle sequences for lacking challenge or skill, and that its web capabilities had been overstated by the developer as it was "nothing more than a boring adventure title with the opportunity to access a Web site".
