= Humanoid animation =

Humanoid Animation (HAnim) is an approved ISO and IEC standard for humanoid modeling and animation. HAnim defines a specification for defining interchangeable human figures so that those characters can be used across a variety of 3D games and simulation environments.

The HAnim Standard was developed in the late 1990s and was significantly influenced by the Jack human modeling system and the research of experts in the graphics, ergonomics, simulation & gaming industry.

== See also ==
- Rich Representation Language
- X3D
- VRML

== Software ==
- Bitmanagement Software Contact VRML/X3D Browser
- ExitReality VRML/X3D Freeware Browser
- Flux Player, VRML/X3D Freeware Browser
- Flux Studio, VRML/X3D Freeware Modeler. Exports H-Anim
- Seamless3d, Open Source Modeler. Exports and Imports H-Anim
