= Erwin Data Modeler =

Data modeling software

erwin Data Modeler
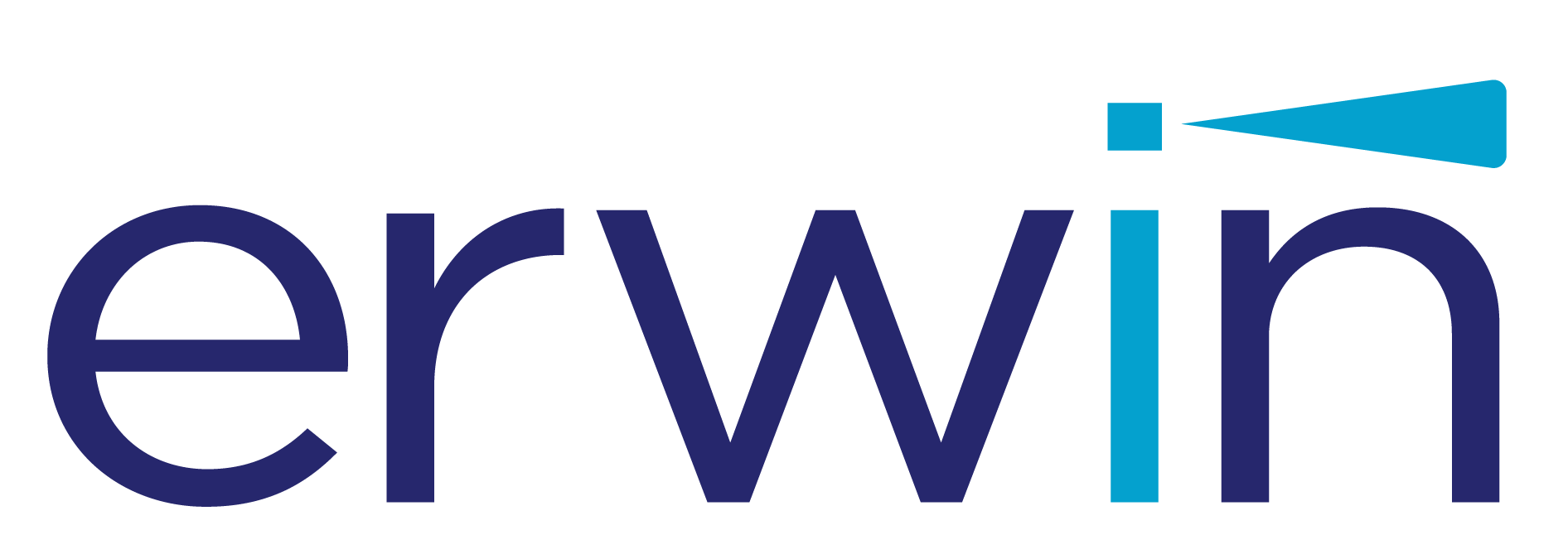

- Developers: Logic Works (Through 1998); Platinum Technology (1998–1999); CA Technologies (1999–2016); erwin, Inc. (2016 to 2021); Quest Software (2021 to present)
- Stable release: 15.2 version / January 6, 2026; 9 months ago
- Operating system: Microsoft Windows and iOS
- Type: CASE tool
- License: Proprietary, Trialware, EULA
- Website: support.quest.com/erwin-data-modeler/15.2/download-new-releases/
- As of: January 2026

erwin Data Modeler (stylized as erwin but formerly as ERwin) is computer software for data modeling. Originally developed by Logic Works, erwin has since been acquired by a series of companies, before being acquired by Quest company in 2021

The software’s engine is based on the IDEF1X method, although it now also supports diagrams displayed with a variant information technology engineering notation, as well as a dimensional modeling notation.

== History ==
ERwin was created by Logic Works, which was based in Princeton, New Jersey. In May 1993, Logic Works released ERwin/ERX, a version of the tool designed to work in conjunction with PowerBuilder. The database models created using ERwin could be translated into software built through the PowerBuilder integrated development environment (IDE). In May 1995, Logic Works ERwin was expanded to include several other IDEs, adding SQLWindows from Gupta Technologies and Visual Basic from Microsoft. As of 1996, ERwin was among several data modeling software solutions being used to facilitate a wide move to the client–server model in database management.

In 1998, Logic Works was acquired by Platinum Technology which was later acquired, in May 1999, by Computer Associates (CA). ERwin was initially made part of CA’s Jasmine suite but it was later added to their new AllFusion suite under the name AllFusion ERwin Data Modeler. The tool was later renamed to CA ERwin Data Modeler.

In 2014 Embarcadero Technologies sought to acquire the product from CA, Inc. This acquisition was blocked by the Department of Justice over anti-competitive concerns.

In April 2016, Parallax Capital Partners, a private equity firm, acquired the software from CA Technologies and appointed Adam Famularo as CEO. The company now operates under a new name stylized as erwin, Inc. In September 2016, erwin announced that it had acquired Corso, a British enterprise architecture service provider. In December of the same year, erwin acquired the business process modeling software Casewise, with a plan to integrate the two. In 2017, erwin released its Data Modeler NoSQL, an enterprise-class data modeling solution for MongoDB. In April 2018, NoSQL data modeling support for Couchbase was added. Also that year, erwin launched a data governance solution with impact analysis and integrations to its business process, enterprise architecture and data modeling suites. In January 2018, the company acquired data harvesting technology and data governance consulting services company A&P Consulting. In January 2021, Quest Software announced the acquisition of erwin, Inc.

They also developed the erwin EDGE software platform, with EDGE as an acronym for “enterprise data governance experience”, intending to use data governance for data-driven insights to help accomplish organizational objectives. In February 2018 erwin released its first State of Data Governance Report with UBM. In August 2018, erwin acquired metadata management and data governance company AnalytiX DS.

On December 31, 2020 erwin, Inc. was acquired by Quest Software. The business unit is headed by Prashant Parikh.

== Overview ==
At its core, erwin has a computer-aided software engineering tool (or CASE tool). Users can utilize erwin Data Modeler as a way to take conceptual data model and create a logical data model that is not dependent on a specific database technology. This schematic model can be used to create the physical data model. Users can then forward engineer the data definition language required to instantiate the schema for a range of database-management systems. The software includes features to graphically modify the model, including dialog boxes for specifying the number of entity–relationships, database constraints, indexes, and data uniqueness. erwin supports three data modeling languages: IDEF1X, a variant of information technology engineering developed by James Martin, and a form of dimensional modeling notation.

The software also allows users to generate data models by reverse-engineering pre-existing databases that are based on several different formats. Another included feature is erwin’s ability to create reusable design standards: “including naming standards, data type standards, model templates and more.” The software includes several features for modifying how the data model is displayed, including options for several colors, fonts, diagrams, subject areas and layouts.

erwin’s Complete Compare feature allows the user to compare two versions of a model, displays differences, and allows for merging and updates in either direction. As of March 2016, the software bundle also includes its own Report Designer. The erwin DM 2018 update included Netezza, MySQL 8.x, PostgreSQL 10.4, and Hive; model counts reports; and PII support. The 2019 update included DB2 z/OS v12, SQL Server 2017, Teradata v16.20, and PostgreSQL 11.2, in addition to reporting enhancements like user-defined properties and filters.

== Notable users ==
Beginning in 1992, the United Nations Development Programme (UNDP) was one of the larger organizations to utilize ERwin to integrate its many independent databases located at its 120 field offices. UNDP used ERwin to develop a “corporate data model”, with the goal of “reducing redundant data entry” and create a single database framework based on which “all future systems can be designed”. ERwin was used to both reverse-engineer existing data at field offices and also move data from Computer Associates’ IDMS to Sybase’s UnixRDBMS.

As of 2001, the insurance company Aetna used Erwin Data Modeler to automate maintenance of its database table definitions. Aetna’s database consisted of 15,000 table definitions which became difficult to maintain manually.

As of 2002, ERwin was among the products used by the New York Power Authority. The software was also in use by Utah State Office of Education as of 2006.
