= Logic Works =

Software company

Logic Works Inc. was a software company created by CEO Benjamin C. Cohen based in Princeton, New Jersey. Their flagship product was an IDEF1X modeling and database design tool called ERwin (ERwin) whose name is formed from an initialism of ER for Entity Relationship and "win", short for windows. The company also produced BPwin (for business process modeling using IDEF0), ModelMart and TestBytes.

The company went public in October 1995 with an IPO of 3.2 million shares at $11, and was traded on the NASDAQ under the symbol LGWX until its eventual sale. In 1998, Logic Works was acquired by Platinum Technology for $174.8 million in stock, which was in turn acquired by Computer Associates the next year. In 2016, erwin, Inc. was launched as an independent company.

== See also ==
- Platinum Technology
- AllFusion ERwin Data Modeler
- erwin, Inc.
