= Web3D =

Web-based interactive 3D content

Web3D, also called 3D Web, is a group of technologies to display and navigate websites using 3D computer graphics. These technologies enable applications such as online games, virtual reality experiences, interactive product demonstrations, and 3D data visualization directly within web browsers.

The emergence of Web3D dates back to 1994, with the advent of VRML, a file format designed to store and display 3D graphical data on the World Wide Web. Modern Web3D is primarily powered by WebGL, a JavaScript API that enables hardware-accelerated 3D graphics rendering in web browsers without requiring plug-ins.

== Pre-WebGL era ==
The emergence of Web3D dates back to 1994, with the advent of VRML, a file format designed to store and display 3D graphical data on the World Wide Web. In October 1995, at Internet World, Template Graphics Software demonstrated a 3D/VRML plug-in for the beta release of Netscape 2.0 by Netscape Communications.

The Web3D Consortium was formed to further the collective development of the format. VRML and its successor, X3D, have been accepted as international standards by the International Organization for Standardization and the International Electrotechnical Commission.

The main drawback of the technology was the requirement to use third-party browser plug-ins to perform 3D rendering, which slowed the adoption of the standard.

Between 2000 and 2010, one of these plug-ins, Adobe Flash Player, was widely installed on desktop computers and was used to display interactive web pages and online games and to play video and audio content. Several Flash-based frameworks appeared that used software rendering and ActionScript 3 to perform 3D computations such as transformations, lighting, and texturing. Most notable among them were Papervision3D and Away3D.

Eventually, Adobe developed Stage3D, an API for rendering interactive 3D graphics with GPU-acceleration for its Flash player and AIR products, which was adopted by software vendors.

In 2009, an open-source 3D web technology called O3D was introduced by Google. It also required a browser plug-in, but contrary to Flash/Stage3D, was based on JavaScript API. O3D was geared not only for games but also for advertisements, 3D model viewers, product demos, simulations, engineering applications, control and monitoring systems.

== WebGL and glTF ==
WebGL (short for "Web Graphics Library") evolved out of the Canvas 3D experiments started by Vladimir Vukićević at Mozilla Foundation. Vukićević first demonstrated a Canvas 3D prototype in 2006. By the end of 2007, both Mozilla and Opera had made their own separate implementations.

In early 2009, the nonprofit technology consortium Khronos Group started the WebGL Working Group, with initial participation from Apple, Google, Mozilla, Opera, and others. Version 1.0 of the WebGL specification was released in March 2011.

Major advantages of the new technology include conformity with web standards and near-native 3D performance without the use of any browser plug-ins. Since WebGL is based on OpenGL ES, it works on mobile devices without any additional abstraction layers. For other platforms, WebGL implementations leverage ANGLE to translate OpenGL ES calls to DirectX, OpenGL, or Vulkan API calls.

Among notable WebGL frameworks are A-Frame, which uses HTML-based markup for building virtual reality experiences; PlayCanvas, an open-source engine alongside a proprietary cloud-hosted creation platform for building browser games; Three.js, an MIT-licensed framework used to create demoscene from the early 2000s; Unity, which obtained a WebGL back-end in version 5; and Verge3D, which integrates with Blender, 3ds Max, and Maya to create 3D web content.

With the rapid adoption of WebGL, a new problem arose—the lack of a 3D file format optimized for the Web. This issue was addressed by glTF, a format that was conceived in 2012 by members of the COLLADA working group. At SIGGRAPH 2012, Khronos presented a demo of glTF, which was then called WebGL Transmissions Format (WebGL TF). On 19 October 2015, the glTF 1.0 specification was released. Version 2.0 glTF uses a physically based rendering material model, proposed by Fraunhofer Institute for Computer Graphics Research IGD. Other upgrades include sparse accessors and morph targets for techniques such as facial animation, and schema tweaks and breaking changes for corner cases or performance, such as replacing top-level glTF object properties with arrays for faster index-based access.

== Future ==
WebGPU is a W3C API that exposes GPU hardware capabilities to the Web for rendering and computation. It is designed to map efficiently to modern native GPU APIs and uses WebGPU Shading Language (WGSL) for shaders.

== See also ==
- Web3D Consortium
- List of WebGL frameworks
- List of vector graphics markup languages
