= Þórólfur Beck Kristjónsson =

Icelandic businessman

- Born: April 14, 1974 (age 51); Reykjavík, Iceland
- Education: Bifröst University (no degree)
- Occupations: Game designer; producer; entrepreneur
- Years active: 1997–present
- Known for: Co-founding CCP Games
- Title: Founder and CEO of NARC Ltd.

Þórólfur Beck Kristjónsson (born April 14, 1974) is an Icelandic entrepreneur, game designer and producer best known for co-founding the video game company CCP Games and creating the board game Hættuspil (Danger Game). Hættuspil remains one of Iceland's most popular board games and CCP's video game EVE Online had 500,000 registered accounts during 2013. EVE also went on to win awards from various gaming media outlets such as PC Gamer magazine and MMORPG.com.

== Early life and education ==
Beck was born and raised in Reykjavik, Iceland, where he has lived for the majority of his life. While originally wanting to become a pilot, he was always interested in video games. The first video games he played were on the Commodore 64 as well as in arcades; his favorite games and main inspirations were Elite and early MUD titles.

In 2003, Þórólfur enrolled in Bifröst University in Borgarbyggð Iceland, where he studied business law for two years. In 2006 he became the agent and producer of an Icelandic music act that went on to compete in a European music competition. He later re-enrolled and continued his studies from 2011 to 2013.

== Career ==
In 1997, along with Reynir Harðarson, Þórólfur co-founded CCP games for the purpose of making MMORPGs. In order to finance the initial development of Eve Online, CCP developed and published a board game in Iceland called Hættuspil (Danger Game). During his time at CCP, he was a co-founder, first CEO, and later had the title of Lead game designer. Þórólfur left CCP in 2002, shortly before Eve Online's release. He later described his dismissal as being “forcibly ejected,” acknowledging that he had become intolerable to work with during that period.

In 2005 Þórólfur became the producer of Silvía Night, an Icelandic singer based on a fictional character who was Iceland's participant in Eurovision Song Contest 2006 with the song "Congratulations" after winning the Icelandic national finals. While failing to win the competition, the act continued to be very popular in Iceland and is still remembered as one of countries most entertaining entries.

In 2007 Þórólfur became Executive Vice President (EVP) of Business Development at LazyTown Entertainment, where he was in charge of tying LazyTown with Wal-Mart Mexico with the aim of promoting healthy lifestyles and delivering fitness ideas to Mexican children and families. LazyTown Entertainment is an Icelandic children's entertainment company that also brands toys and healthy food items. Its main TV show Lazy Town (originally Latibær) was based on a popular Icelandic children play and has aired in over 180 countries.

Beck is currently working on a MMO project under the company name "NARC".
