= CyberTown =

Former online virtual world

- View of CyberTown's Plaza and interface
- Website type: Social Network
- Available in: English
- Owner: Integrated Virtual Networks
- Founders: Hawk & SFX
- Website: www.cybertown.com
- Commercial: Yes
- Registration: Required
- Launched: April 19, 1995
- Current status: Defunct

CyberTown (CT) (formerly Colony City) was an online virtual world. There were places (chat rooms) available either through a 2D or 3D chat environment. Users were able to have jobs within the community, earning virtual money called CCs (CityCash) that could be used to buy 3D homes and items. Each user was allowed a free 2D home and could locate it within any of a number of colonies subdivided into neighborhoods and blocks. The cost was $5.00 per month or $49.99 a year.

As of September 2011, the site's membership base declined, and in February 2012, it was taken offline. In the years since, a small group of former community members have developed a new version of the platform.

The history of CyberTown has been discussed in detail by Nadezhda Kaneva as an illustration of the social dynamics that emerge in online communities.

== History ==
Colony City was started in 1996 as a showcase project of Blaxxun Interactive. Colony City made use of VRML (Virtual Reality Modeling Language), a standard for displaying 3D content, including virtual worlds and avatars, on the Web. These VRML files became shared virtual worlds using Blaxxun's server technology, enabling people from all over the world to meet and interact in rich-media environments in real-time on the Web.

In 1999, Colony City merged with CyberTown which dramatically increased the users to a few thousand. At the time CyberTown was mainly a portal site with categories of links, but Colony City was able to use the ideas from the categories to make 3D worlds and expand CyberTown. To allow this influx of citizens to have homes in CyberTown, new "colonies" - virtual places to live - were created.

In 2002, Blaxxun Interactive sold CyberTown to Integrated Virtual Networks.

As of February 2012, the CyberTown website was taken offline.

== Revival ==
A group of former citizens has dedicated itself to restoring CyberTown as it was prior to its original shutdown, and, in 2019, a pre-alpha version of the platform was successfully launched as CyberTown Revival, a free fan-made restoration. CyberTown Revival is the result of hundreds of former residents drawing on everything from archived blog posts to the contents of former citizens' hard drives.

== Economics ==
Citizens were able to hold jobs within the city, earning a daily wage in CityCash. Citizens could use CityCash to purchase upgraded 3D homes and 3D objects. Citizens could also create their own 3D objects via VRML and sell them in the city's mall for profit. This created a plethora of diverse and rare items that could be sold secondhand either out of a citizen's backpack (inventory), in the Flea Market, or in the Black Market.
