= Dust 514 =

2013 first-person shooter video game

EVE: Dust 514
- Developer: CCP Shanghai
- Publishers: CCP Games; Sony Computer Entertainment
- Engine: Unreal Engine 3
- Platform: PlayStation 3
- Release: WW: May 14, 2013
- Genre: First-person shooter
- Mode: Multiplayer

Dust 514 (/ˈdʌst faɪv wʌn fɔːrˈ/) is a discontinued free-to-play first-person shooter video game, developed by CCP Shanghai and published by CCP Games and Sony Computer Entertainment for the PlayStation 3. Dust 514 took place in New Eden and was directly connected to CCP's game Eve Online. There was direct interaction between the two; player actions in one game affected the political, economic, legal, environmental, and social status of the other. The two games were officially connected on January 10, 2013 in preparation for the open beta on January 22. The full game was released worldwide on May 14, 2013. While previews of the game were highly positive, the full game received a mixed reception upon its initial release. It received constant updates and hotfixes after release. The game was shut down on May 30, 2016.

== Setting ==
Dust 514 took place in the same fictional universe as Eve Online, a science fiction massively multiplayer online role-playing game (MMORPG) set 21,000 years in the future. The Eve Online backstory explains that humanity, after using up the Earth's resources, began to colonize the rest of the Milky Way. The development of faster-than-light travel allowed mankind to expand at an extremely fast pace, leading to violent competition between space-faring corporations. A natural wormhole was discovered, and humanity entered through it to find an empty new galaxy which they began colonizing. However, the wormhole connecting the two galaxies collapsed, leaving the young colonies cut off from the worlds that had supplied them. Without support, many of the colonies in the new galaxy died off, and over time the few that remained lost their knowledge of both their technology and of their origins from Earth. Eventually, a new era began when civilization was rebuilt and faster-than-light travel was rediscovered. Five unique space-faring cultures emerged from the colonies to become the only interstellar powers in the new galaxy; the Amarr, Caldari, Gallente, Jove and Minmatar.

Eve Online players take the role of capsuleers, who are elite starship pilots made immortal using cloning technology and consciousness transfers. For much of Eve history, only capsuleers were immortal because the technology required to download consciousness was linked to a capsule that encloses them and leaves them in suspended animation. The capsule was designed specifically as an interface for pilots to control the ship that they were placed within. However, the discovery of a special implant made it possible to achieve a transfer of consciousness without the use of a capsule, so it became possible to make immortals that were not pilots. Dust 514 players took the role of immortal ground-based soldiers which were created by the military shortly after the implant was discovered.

== Gameplay ==
Dust 514 allowed players to customize infantry and vehicles with a modular fitting system similar to the ship fitting system in Eve Online.

Dust 514 was a first-person shooter with elements of massively multiplayer online games. Combat took place on the various planets found in Eve Online, each offering a substantial amount of unique maps and sockets. Planets were divided into several large districts, which held resources and installations that dust players had to fight for control over in Planetary Conquest battles, or PC battles for short. Only the natural landscapes of each planet remained constant; the placement of buildings and surface structures was controlled by the player corporations.

Infantry in Dust 514 were equipped with "dropsuits" which functioned similarly to the ship hulls in Eve Online. Dropsuits had various module slots which players could utilize to fit different weapons, equipment and skins. Dust 514 entities had two different health meters: Shields and Armor; of which each had individual advantages and disadvantages. In addition, certain weapons affected one health type more than the other. For instance, the Scrambler Rifle would deal 20 percent more damage to shields but 20 percent less damage to armor. There were 3 different dropsuit variants for each race with corresponding advantages and disadvantages; light, medium, and heavy dropsuits; each of which branched out to their corresponding specialized dropsuit. Some examples were the Caldari Heavy Frame which could lead to the Caldari Commando and Sentinel, the Gallente Medium Frame led to the Gallente Assault and Logistics, and the Minmatar Light Frame led to the Minmatar Scout. This gave players a broad range of customization choices and the ability to create specialized fits to perform specific roles and tactics on the battlefield.

Skill training, in a manner similar to Eve Online, was also available. CCP has stated that it would take seven years to train all skills, and that it was not intended for any player to learn all of the skills. Instead, CCP believed that players would naturally become specialized by selecting a certain set of skills and becoming "really, really good at them." These skills unlocked new and better items, better passive bonuses, as well as unlocking other skills. Player-driven vehicles were also available in the game; these could be transported to anywhere within the battlefield using "rapid deployment vehicles (RDV)" at the request of players. Vehicles shared the modular fitting system that infantry dropsuits had but modules cost more than those of a dropsuit.

Different game modes in Dust 514 were Ambush, Acquisition, Domination, and Skirmish. In Ambush and Ambush OMS, the goal of each team was to deplete the event team's Clone reserves. In Acquisition, the goal was to control timed nodes that move every five minutes. In Domination and Skirmish, the goal of each team was to destroy the opposing mobile command center.

Although Dust 514 players were mercenaries, they could also seize territory from planets within a section of the Eve universe called Molden Heath for their own alliance and corporation, which took place in the form of Corporation vs. Corporation matches. This allowed Dust 514 corporations to build infrastructure on captured territory, but it was unclear what manufacturing power Dust 514 corporations would have. Dust 514 players could also work together with Eve players in capturing systems in Eve Online's factional warfare space; Dust 514 players could speed up or slow down the rate at which a system could be captured by winning battles for the attacking faction.

=== Connection to Eve Online ===
In a demonstration by CCP Games, an Eve Online Abaddon-class battleship (left) fires on a ground target designated by a Dust 514 soldier (right).

All combat within Dust 514 took place, in real-time, on planets found in the Eve Online universe. The player alliances and corporations of Eve Online could hire Dust 514 players as mercenaries to fight for control over planets; the outcome of such battles were expected to eventually affect the sovereignty of player-run political powers in Eve Online. A direct form of interaction came in the form of "orbital bombardments". Orbital bombardments allowed a player in Eve Online to provide direct assistance to friendly forces in a battle in Dust 514. If a player in Eve Online were in position above a planet with proper bombardment equipment, the player could fire upon a target designated by a friendly Dust 514 player. This was first shown to the public as an actual in-game mechanic during EVE Fanfest 2012, although it had been previously featured during the 2011 fanfest in a cinematic trailer titled A Future Vision.

Both games shared the same namespace, so a player in Dust 514 could not choose a username that already existed in Eve Online or vice versa. This allowed players from both games to join the same corporation or alliance, as well as communicate between the two games in real-time.

In an interview conducted by Simon Carless of Gamasutra, CCP CEO Hilmar Veigar Pétursson said that he hoped "these [Eve Online and Dust 514] communities will meld over time", bridging the two environments. He described the relationship between the flying-oriented nature of Eve Online and the infantry-oriented nature of Dust 514, saying "while the fleet does the flying, the infantry does the dying". The massive Eve universe would have been the platform for all planetary combat. Brandon Laurino, executive producer of Dust 514, stated that there would not be a set number of maps at launch, saying "We are covering literally a universe of planets, so there's thousands of different maps and they're all available to everyone who's playing."

== Development ==
Dust 514 was announced on August 18, 2009, at the Game Developers Conference in Cologne, Germany where it was introduced with a short trailer featuring real time footage of the game.

In 2010, CCP updated Eve Online with the Tyrannis expansion. Tyrannis introduced planetary interaction, allowing players to harvest resources from planets using ground installations. A developer blog by CCP mentioned that, while the expansion alone would not include planetary combat, the upcoming Dust 514 game would deal with the combat aspect by allowing players to "project military force for attack and defense of planetary installations." Planets in Eve Online previously held no value; the Tyrannis expansion was intended to tie into Dust 514 by giving players "a reason to want to fight over [the planets]."

The original logo for Dust 514, used from its announcement up to E3 2011

CCP Games reached an agreement with Epic Games China in 2010 to license Unreal Engine 3 for use in Dust 514.

During E3 2011, it was confirmed that Dust 514 would be released exclusively on the PlayStation 3 and PlayStation Vita. A beta would be held before the end of 2011 followed by a release in the summer of 2012. However, afterward CCP opted to put more work into the game to improve it further and have a release date in 2013, rather than a 2012 release date. Dust 514 was initially slated to be the first cross-platform game, pitting Xbox 360 and PlayStation 3 players with each other but CCP later dropped the Xbox 360 as a potential platform; the choice of PlayStation 3 exclusive was determined by Sony's more open platform allowing Dust 514 to connect to the Eve Online server Tranquility, whereas Microsoft's Xbox Live did not. It was also confirmed after E3 2011 that Dust 514 utilized Havok middleware technology.

Dust 514 was connected to Tranquility, the live production server of Eve Online, on January 10, 2013. The complexity of running two games on one server proved to be a unique challenge for the developers. To mitigate any performance issues that this might have on either of the two games, CCP designed a server architecture such that the majority of Dust 514 gameplay was run on various "battle clusters" across the world. These server clusters would handle all the latency sensitive first-person shooter aspects of Dust 514. The main Eve cluster, located in London, would only communicate with Dust 514 for information such as character names.

The game was released on May 14, 2013, with an update titled Uprising. This release build improved many aspects of the game, such as the graphics and character progression, and introduced the planetary conquest mechanic. Although Uprising was the initial release build, CCP said that it would not be the final major update: "Even when we take off the beta tag the launches don't stop. We'll launch significant updates indefinitely... It's an on-going service that will keep getting better and better."

=== Future developments ===
At CCP's 2012 Fanfest, even before the release of Dust 514, CCP had already revealed ideas for expansions in 2013. Possible future features included the ability to traverse on planets with "hostile" environments (such as lava planets) and the addition of mechanized exoskeletons that players could use, called MTACs.

At CCP's 2014 Fanfest, the company revealed that development would be split between Dust 514 and Project Legion, a prototype for a PC-based first-person shooter that would attempt to address some of the shortcomings in Dust 514. They planned on developing a distinct experience in the new prototype that was more aligned with their vision, while continuing to maintain some limited development of Dust 514. Had they decided the prototype was successful they stated they would have transferred existing player profiles and assets to the new game. This announcement was met with criticism from some of the player base, leading groups of core players to believe that CCP was abandoning Dust 514 in favor of Project Legion. At Eve Fanfest 2015, CCP said that while Project Legion was in works their main focus was on Dust 514. However, CCP announced that Dust 514 would officially shut down on May 30, 2016.

On April 21, 2016, CCP announced development of the game Project Nova, a free-to-play first-person lobby shooter for the PC using Unreal Engine 4 set in the EVE Online universe. CCP developer CCP Rattati emphasized that Project Nova was a project not a product; there was no guarantee that it would become a CCP game.

On September 22, 2023, CCP unveiled EVE: Vanguard, a free first-person shooter that would have its first beta test in December 2023.

=== PlayStation Home ===
In the PlayStation's online social gaming platform PlayStation Home, a game space for Dust 514 was released on June 13, 2012. The game space provided information about mercenaries and the Eve Universe as well as a mini-game known as Slay, a tabletop strategy game. Users could also earn special rewards such as a Merc Dropsuit and a Companion Drone. The game space for Dust 514 became unavailable when PlayStation Home was closed on March 31, 2015.

== Business model ==
Unlike Eve Online, Dust 514 did not require a monthly subscription. It instead used a micro-transaction model, making the game free to play. The game had two currencies: Aurum; which could be earned or bought with real money, and ISK; similar to but non-fungible with the primary currency in Eve Online that shares the same name. CCP's chief marketing officer, David Reid, compared this model to that of League of Legends. Reid said that Dust 514 is not a "pay-to-win" game. While some equipment could have been purchased with Aurum, the only benefit was a slightly different skin and lower skill requirements. Since the skills in question actually improved the performance of the equipment, performance of the Aurum-bought gear was actually slightly sub-par unless the skills were trained anyway.

== Reception ==
Reception

Aggregate scores
Aggregator	Score
GameRankings	59.10%
Metacritic	59/100

Review scores
Publication	Score
Destructoid	6/10
Edge	4/10
Eurogamer	5/10
GameSpot	4/10
GamesRadar+	3/5
GameTrailers	4.4/10
IGN	5.8/10
VentureBeat	72/100
Metro GameCentral	5/10
Hardcore Gamer	3.5/5
PSU	9/10

=== Pre-release ===
Before release Dust 514 was considered innovative for its connection to another game. IGN said that the game was highly ambitious and called it "...a Glimpse of the Future", while PC Gamer praised the orbital bombardment mechanic and the unprecedented amount of customization available.

=== Release ===
Upon release the game received mixed reception from critics. It attained an average aggregate score of 59.10% on GameRankings and 59/100 on Metacritic, indicating mixed or average reviews.

Criticisms were generally focused on the bugs and poor execution of the gameplay. IGN's Vince Ingenito stated that Dust 514's incredible depth and customization were eclipsed by its poor graphics and gameplay mechanics. Additionally, Ingenito criticized the way the game implemented the free-to-play business model, saying it took too long for players to get into the equipment that they wanted. He ultimately gave the game a score of 5.8/10, calling it mediocre. Destructoid's Chris Carter gave the game a rating of 6/10, calling it an ambitious and complex shooter that still needed "a ton of work". Among the aspects that he criticized were the underwhelming graphics, the unoriginal game modes, and the tedious grind. Eurogamer reviewer Paul Dean wrote that Dust 514 has great potential but is "saddled with a very dull debut." Dean noted that despite having interesting factors, such as the metagame and social connection to Eve Online, the game itself was mediocre and contained many bugs. However Alex Locher of PlayStation Universe praised the unique nature of Dust 514, commending its technological accomplishments and meaningful player interaction. As Locher remarked, "Dust 514 isn't some superficial and meaningless military shooter; it's a pioneering endeavour of programming, technology and consumer communication that has already created something unlike you've ever seen in gaming".

Despite having mixed critical reception, CEO of the publisher CCP Games Hilmar Veigar Pétursson said in March 2015 that the company is very satisfied with the sales of the game, saying that "Dust 514 is a profitable business of the company."
