= SAPARi =

Discontinued virtual world

- Developer: Sony (Note: Developed by Sony Architecture Lab and Workstation Unit divisions, and then moved to the VAIO Development Unit)
- Type: Virtual world
- Launched: February 6, 1997; 29 years ago
- Current version: 1.0.1 (Last version)
- Last updated: February 16, 2001; 25 years ago
- Platform: Windows
- Status: Closed (Note: The original servers have been shut down since January 31, 2003. Active fan servers have existed since July 2020.)
- Website: SAPARi homepage at the Wayback Machine (archived 4 October 2002)

SAPARi (さぱり) was an online 3-D virtual world service developed in Java and run by Sony. Users could speak to one another and join chat lobbies by using a dedicated server browser called the Community Place Browser. Upon selecting a server, users would appear in a 3-D virtual world as an avatar in the form of a human or an animal. The service's name is a shortening of the name Sampo Park Relaxation. From 1997 to 2001, the service came pre-installed on Sony's VAIO series of computers. The official SAPARi service was discontinued on January 31, 2003.

== Gameplay ==
=== Worlds ===
Worlds were 3D virtual spaces written in Virtual Reality Modeling Language (VRML) and ran on Sony's dedicated servers. At the time of the service's launch, only one World, named "Park", was available to users. Numerous other Worlds were added as the number of players increased.

=== Browser ===
SAPARi used its own dedicated browser for use by clients that could run VRML. Called the Community Place Browser, it was organized into a main window used for displaying 3D graphics, and a second window containing the chat lot titled "Multi-User Window". It also handled another piece of software which came pre-installed on the VAIO series developed and sold by Sony called the "Internet 3D Pack". Even though the servers are no longer in operation, it is still possible to browse the internet in VRML by operating a SAPARi avatar.

=== Avatars ===
SAPARi avatars consisted of over 100 human and animal models, and allowed for customizable colors and scaling. By default, players would begin as a pink cat. Certain Worlds would have restrictions on which Avatars could be used on them.

=== Communication ===
Multiple users were able to converse with each other within a certain proximity. When a user spoke, their message would appear above their avatar for a short period of time and would be logged in the chat window. Users were able to perform actions with their avatars, such as waving or sleeping.

== Development ==
Tsunetake Noma's PC during development was a DEC, and his monitor was a Mitsubishi Diamond model. For GCO, A VRML output was created using 3DCG software called "LightWave 3D" from NewTek Co.. Polygons were edited using "LightWave3D".

The development process is described below:

1. 3D modelling (DXF format)
2. DXF was converted to VRML (only for models)
3. Authoring in VRML (adding movement)
4. Movement was originally programmed in Java (TCL/TK at the very beginning)
5. Movement testing on the Community Place Browser
6. For a server-Client environment, testing was done on multiple PCs.
7. 3D contents are published
8. The official site is updated and moderated by a user group
9. User Communication and support is opened in the 3D contents

Modelling was done by placing an order to the designer. Noma was in charge of the entire process after the DXF file was received from the designer. Noma also overlooked the direction of the project.

=== Timeline ===
- February 6, 1997 - Beginning of the SAPARi Service
- November 1999 - "SAPARi Millenium" β version release
- January 2000 - "SAPARi Millenium" official release
- September 1, 2001 - A usage fee is added to the service (300¥ monthly)
- January 31, 2003 - End of the SAPARi service

Since SAPARi came pre-installed on VAIO systems, it reached hundreds of thousands of users at one point. However, server fees and the lack of a business model relating to the increase in new users stopped the user base from expanding. After this, control of SAPARi was transferred to So-net, which added fees to previously free material. Users actively disliked this, which led to the collapse of the community, causing revenue to sharply decrease and eventually the entire service to shut down at the end of January 2003. However, in 2020, two private servers were made thanks to reverse-engineering and fan efforts, with them being Kogs and Kitunes, respectively.

== See also ==
- Online chat
- VRML
- PlayStation Home
