= Mark Pesce =

American-Australian author, researcher, engineer, futurist and teacher (born 1962)

Mark D. Pesce
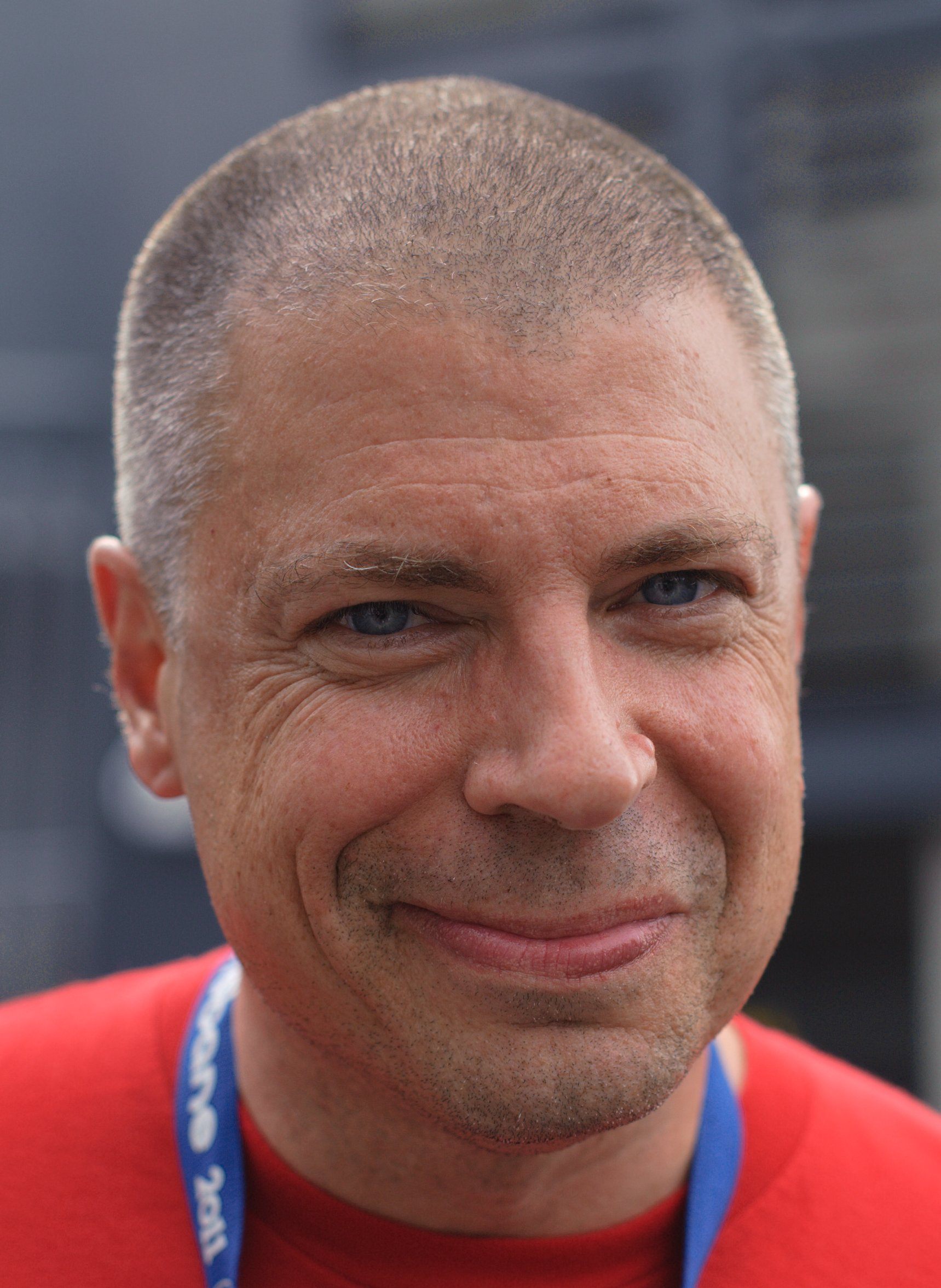
- Mark Pesce at LCA2011 in Brisbane, Australia
- Born: December 8, 1962 (age 63); Everett, Massachusetts, United States
- Occupations: author, researcher, engineer, futurist and teacher
- Known for: co-inventor of VRML

Mark D. Pesce (/ˈpɛʃi/ PESH-ee; born 1962) is an American-Australian author, researcher, engineer, futurist and teacher.

== Early life ==
Pesce was born on December 8, 1962, in Everett, Massachusetts. In September 1980, Pesce attended Massachusetts Institute of Technology (MIT) for a Bachelor of Science degree, but left in June 1982 to pursue opportunities in the newly emerging high-tech industry. He worked as an engineer for the next few years, developing prototype firmware and software for SecurID cards.

== Career ==
In 1988, Pesce joined Shiva Corporation, which pioneered and popularized dial-up networking. Pesce's role in the company was to develop user interfaces, and his research extended into virtual reality.

In 1991, Pesce founded the Ono-Sendai Corporation, named after a fictitious company in the William Gibson novel Neuromancer. Ono-Sendai was a first-generation virtual reality startup, chartered to create inexpensive, home-based networked VR systems. The company developed a key technology, which earned Pesce his first patent for a "Sourceless Orientation Sensor" that tracks the motion of persons in virtual environments. Sega Corporation of America would use the technology on the design of the Sega VR, a consumer head-mounted display (HMD).

In 1993, Apple hired Pesce as a consulting engineer to develop interfaces between Apple and IBM networking products. In early 1994, while in San Francisco, Pesce, with software engineers Tony Parisi and Gavin Bell, spearheaded an effort to standardize 3D on the Web, and formed VRML Architecture Group (VAG), under the leadership of Pesce. The purpose of VRML was to allow for the creation of 3D environments within the World Wide Web, accessible through a web browser. Working in conjunction with such corporations as Microsoft, Netscape, Silicon Graphics, Sun Microsystems and Sony, Pesce convinced the industry to accept the new protocol as a standard for desktop virtual reality. This development spring-boarded Pesce into a career which has included extensive writings for both the popular and scientific press, teaching and lecturing at universities, conferences, performances, presentations, and film appearances.

== Australia ==
In 2003, Pesce moved to Australia, where he continues to live, and became an Australian citizen on 4 February 2011. He is an Honorary Lecturer at the University of Sydney and was a judge on The New Inventors, a nationally televised program in Australia.

In 2006, Pesce founded FutureSt, a Sydney consultancy, serving as an advisory to analytics firm PeopleBrowsr, and The Serval Project.

In 2008, Pesce began writing an online column for the Australian Broadcasting Corporation's The Drum Opinion.

More recently Pesce has been designing and coding Plexus, a Web 2.0 address book and social networking tool, and is writing his next book, The Next Billion Seconds. His current major project, however, is Light MooresCloud, an ambient device of 52-LEDs which is a lamp with a LAMP-stack; the trademark pays homage to the inexpensive ubiquitous computing engendered by Moore's Law. Inspired by the GPIO of a borrowed Raspberry Pi, which he realized allowed web users anywhere on the planet to turn an LED on or off on his machine from their browsers, MooresCloud was brought from concept to prototype by a team in eight weeks. Highly configurable, the device has been touted as "illumination as a service".

From January 2004 through January 2006, Pesce was the senior lecturer in Emerging Media and Interactive Design at the Australian Film Television and Radio School (AFTRS) in Sydney, Australia. He now holds an Honorary Appointment at the University of Sydney and has shared some of his lectures online.

== Other teaching ==
Pesce began his teaching career in 1996 as a VRML instructor at both the University of California, Santa Cruz and San Francisco State University, where he would later create the school's certificate program in the 3-D Arts. In 1998, Pesce was asked to join the faculty of the University of Southern California, as the founding chair of the Graduate Program in Interactive Media at the USC School of Cinema-Television.

== Books ==
- Mark Pesce: Augmented Reality: Unboxing Tech's next big thing. Polity Press, 2021.
- Mark Pesce. The Next Billion Seconds. Blurb, 2012
- Mark Pesce, Programming DirectShow and Digital Video. Seattle, Washington, Microsoft Press, May 2003.
- Mark Pesce, The Playful World: How Technology Transforms our Imagination. New York, Ballantine Books (Random House), October 2000.
- Mark Pesce, Learning VRML: Design for Cyberspace. Cambridge, Massachusetts: Ziff-Davis Publishing, 1997.
- Mark Pesce, VRML: Flying through the Web. Indianapolis, Indiana: New Riders Publishing, 1996.
- Mark Pesce, VRML: Browsing and Building Cyberspace. Indianapolis, Indiana: New Riders Publishing, 1995.
- Introduction to Celia Pearce, The Interactive Book. Indianapolis, Indiana: Macmillan Technical Publishing, 1997.

== Film projects ==
- Man With a Movie Tube, short form video, January 2007
- Unbomb, short form video, August 2003.
- Body Hits (BBC 3), location producer, November 2002.
- This Strange Eventful History, feature length video about Burning Man, August 2002
- Becoming Transhuman, feature length video, inspired by Terence McKenna and others, August 2001
