= Virtual environment software =

Virtual environment software refers to any software, program or system that implements, manages and controls multiple virtual environment instances (self definition). The software is installed within an organization's existing IT infrastructure and controlled from within the organization itself. From a central interface, the software creates an interactive and immersive experience for administrators and users.

== Uses ==
Virtual environment software can be used for any use, from advanced military training in a virtual environment simulator to virtual classrooms. Many Virtual Environments are being used as branding channels for products and services by enterprise corporations and non-profit groups.

Virtual events and virtual tradeshows have been the early accepted uses of virtual event services. More recently, virtual environment software platforms have offered choices to enterprises – with the ability to connect people across the Internet. Virtual environment software enables organizations to extend their market and industry reach while reducing (all travel-related) costs and time.

== Background ==
Providers of virtual environments have tended to focus on the early marketplace adoption of virtual events. These providers are typically software as a service (SaaS)-based. Most have evolved from the streaming media/gaming arena and social networking applications.

This early virtual event marketplace is now moving towards 3D persistent environments, where enterprises combine e-commerce, social media as core operating systems, and is evolving into virtual environments for branding, customer acquisition, and service centers. A persistent environment enables users, visitors and administrators to re-visit a part or parts of the event or session. Information gathered by attendees and end users is typically stored in a virtual briefcase including contact information and marketing materials.
