= Persistent environment =

A persistent environment is a virtual community—most often with a singular, continuing purpose. It is typically used as a branding channel, residing online for months and providing an immersive, singular branding experience. A perpetual virtual environment is continuous online location where people, resources, applications, data and events are aggregated together and connected in order to facilitate communication, learning, collaboration, marketing, purchasing, service, support, and relationships.

== Overview/uses ==
A persistent environment may include multiple user features and functionality but has one or two primary goals: increased social networking engagement, and therefore, increased sales through increased user awareness. Persistent environments may be connected to an organization, e-commerce, telesales, registration, transactions or other systems.

Persistent environments are long-term branding, educational or sales events experienced online. A unique virtual space, these persistent online environments bring focus to services or product features—by allowing consumers (and the B2B marketplace) to experience a brand category in new, virtual ways.

When used as a training event, a persistent environment would have a testing component. Persistent environments may also be used for professional licensing accreditation and would have a continued education component of current curricula to maintain standards.

For consumer branding, persistent environments may also be thought of as a 'sticky virtual environment' that engages users for health, recreational, repair, personal finance or other online experiential needs.

== Current uses ==
Currently, persistent environments are made possible through the use of virtual environment software. This provides an organization with an internally controlled virtual environment, implemented with their existing IT infrastructure or via an external web hosting agreement.

Persistent environments provide ownership of data metrics, user interactions, performance and lead generation. The ownership of this data extends indefinitely, beyond the duration of the persistent environment. This enables organizations to better analyze and compare market trends, consumer habits and brand recognition against existing and future data.
