= Flux (graphics software) =

Graphics and animation software suite

Flux was a software suite released by Media Machines which consisted of Flux Player and Flux Studio.

Flux Player was a VRML/X3D viewer that worked both as plugin in Internet Explorer, and as standalone program in Windows. Flux Studio was a VRML/X3D editor that worked in Windows. Both programs supported Windows Me/2000 and higher.

Flux Player and Flux Studio were freely downloadable for any usage under a proprietary Flux Player and Flux Studio license.

Flux software was developed by Tony Parisi, who coworked with Mark Pesce on the development of the experimental VRML prototype called Labyrinth. Flux Studio could successfully import and export *.WRL, *.X3DV and *.X3D files.

Initial distribution version of Flux Player 2.0 and Flux Studio 2.0 was released on February 21, 2007; while final distribution version of Flux Player 2.1 and Flux Studio 2.1 was released on May 28, 2007.

== Acquisitions ==
In May 2008, MediaMachines became Vivaty, and the Flux software was rebranded as Vivaty. However, on April 16, 2010, Vivaty shut down and was subsequently acquired by Microsoft.
