= OZ Virtual =

VR software

OZ Virtual was a 3D world viewer created by OZ Interactive that enabled real-time collaboration communications in shared spaces on the Internet with a strong focus on creative content production.

The viewer supported the Virtual Reality Modeling Language (VRML 2.0) a standard for creating and experiencing virtual reality worlds on the Internet. It came with an avatar editor that allowed the user to select from a set of pre-defined avatars with body movements and modify their appearance. Users could communicate using voice chat using low bandwidth codecs supplied by Voxware.

One of the features of this VRML browser was that anyone browsing a given URL could see and interact with any other users visiting the same URL at the same time, thus making it an instantaneous shared virtual space.

== Timeline ==
1. The first version of the software was released in beta on July 24, 1996, with support for VRML 1.0, avatars, and social interaction.
2. A subsequent release on December 11, 1996 added support for VRML 2.0 including support for VRML 2 scripting using Java.
3. OZ Virtual 2.0, released March 12, 1997, enabled editing of avatars, and embedding of various components of OZ Virtual onto web pages using ActiveX technology
4. The OZ Virtual technology was spun off from OZ Interactive into a separate company named SmartVR on November 24, 1999. The SmartVR team and tech stack then emerged into CCP to be the foundation for EVE Online. In 2018, there is still source code in EVE Online that originates from OZ Virtual.

== Partnerships ==
- OZ Virtual was used to broadcast, in 3D using motion capture, a live concert co-hosted by Intel and OZ Interactive.
- OZ Virtual 2.0 was used to create a 3D product showcase for Ericsson.
- OZ Virtual 2.0 was also used to create a 3D world composed of Cartoon Network characters for Time Warner.
- Atlantic Records used OZ Virtual to create a 3D site for its artists.
- The Van Gogh Museum offered 3D renderings of some of Van Gogh's pictures which were created in OZ Virtual and made available on the museum's website.
