= Web3D Consortium =

International industry consortium

- Formation: 1997 (29 years ago)
- Type: NPO
- Legal status: 501(c)(6) private
- Headquarters: Salinas, California; 36°40′40″N 121°39′20″W
- Official language: English
- President: Nicholas Polys
- Website: web3d.org

Web3D Consortium is an international not-for-profit, member-funded industry consortium, originally founded in 1997. Web3D Consortium members from governmental, nonprofit and research organizations worldwide, including working alongside individual professional members to collaborate in a consensus process and encouraging development and implementation of open standards for 3D content and services.

The Web3D Consortium promotes deployment of X3D standards for the communication of 3D scenes in multiple applications, use cases, platforms, and verticals. Members collaboratively develop the X3D standards and tools making them widely adopted across markets for academia, government, industry, and individuals. The Web3D Consortium offers ISO standardized 3D functionality and long-term stability for enterprise solutions and interoperability with other 3D standards.

The Consortium defines and develops the X3D royalty-free open standards file format and runtime architecture to represent and communicate 3D scenes. The development of 3D web-based graphics has evolved from its beginnings as the Virtual Reality Modeling Language (VRML) to Extensible 3D (X3D). Over recent years, advances in real time graphics and networking technology, and most notably the emergence of the Extensible Markup Language XML, have heavily influenced the development of the ISO-approved, freely available, X3D open standard. X3D embodies best practices in commercial real time graphics within the widely adopted framework of the World Wide Web family of technologies and standards and has no intellectual property restrictions. It provides a system for the storage, retrieval and playback of real time graphics content embedded in applications, all within an open architecture to support a wide array of domains and user scenarios.

Web3D applications have been active for some time. Previously known as the VRML Consortium, this community spearheaded the development of the VRML 1.0 and 2.0 specifications, which provide the basis for the development of associated applications. The organizations involved in this effort felt that the creation of an open consortium focused exclusively on Web3D would provide the structure necessary to stabilize, standardize, and nurture the technology for the entire community. Today, the Web3D Consortium is utilizing its broad-based industry support to develop the X3D specification as a successor to VRML for communicating 3D on the web, between applications and across distributed networks and web services.

Related to its educational mission, the Consortium maintains an extensive website of documents and links related to VRML and X3D resources, including plugins and browsers from many long-term members and open source developers.

== See also ==
- VRML, the first ISO-standard format for 3D browsing
- X3D, modern descendant of VRML that includes XML encoding
- Web3D
- WebGL
