= Platinum Technology =

Defunct computer software company

Platinum Technology, Inc.
- Founded: 1987; 39 years ago in the United States
- Founder: Andrew Filipowski
- Defunct: 1999; 27 years ago
- Fate: Acquired by Computer Associates

Platinum Technology, Inc., was an American software company founded by Andrew Filipowski in 1987 to market and support deployment of database management software products and the applications enabled by database management technology and to render related services. Over its 12-year history, it was known for its acquisition of other companies, having bought more than 50 companies between 1994 and 1999 and growing to become the eighth largest global software company with revenue of a billion dollars per year. Acquisitions included Altai, Inc. (1995), AutoSystems Corporation, Brownstone Solutions, ICON Computing, Intervista Software, Software Interfaces, Locus Computing Corporation, LBMS (1998), Logic Works (1998), Protosoft, RELTECH Group, Memco Software, Softool, SQL TOOLS, Inc., Trinzic, Viatech and VREAM (1996). The company was a member of the UML Partners consortium.

== Acquisition by Computer Associates ==
In March 1999, Platinum was itself acquired by Computer Associates (CA) for $3.5 billion, at that time the largest transaction in the history of the software industry. CA offered $29.25 per share, almost a three-to-one premium over Platinum's stock price of $9.875.

== Transition ==
In 2001, CA was sued by the United States Department of Justice (DOJ), alleging that the two companies prematurely reduced competition between each other. The DOJ claimed that this was achieved by agreeing to limit discounts offered to customers before the deal was completed.

== Acquisitions ==
=== Protosoft ===
Protosoft Inc.
- Industry: Computer software
- Founded: 1990
- Defunct: 1995
- Fate: acquired by Platinum Technology
- Headquarters: Houston, TX United States
- Key people: Dr. Anthony Lekkos, Erick Rivas, founders
- Products: Enterprise modeling software
- Number of employees: 50

In November 1995, Protosoft was acquired by Platinum Technology for $40 million.

=== Memco Software ===
Memco Software Ltd.
- Industry: Computer software
- Founded: 1990
- Defunct: 1998
- Fate: merged with Platinum Technology
- Headquarters: Tel Aviv Israel
- Key people: Israel Mazin (Founder and CEO)
- Products: Software security solution
- Number of employees: 150

In September 1998, Platinum Technology acquired Israeli company Memco Software (Nasdaq: MEMCF). The acquisition was accounted for as a stock-for-stock pooling of interests valued at just more than $400 million. The combined offering of both companies was aimed at providing a complete software security solution for protecting enterprise networks, databases, and systems across multiple platforms.

Memco Software was founded in 1990 in Tel Aviv, Israel; in 1996 it had an initial public offering on NASDAQ, raising $50 million. Following the acquisition of Platinum by Computer Associates, Memco Software became the basis for CA’s research and development center in Israel.
