= Battle of Asakai =

Massive-scale virtual battle in the game Eve Online

- Screenshot of the Battle of Asakai
Date	January 26–27, 2013 (YC 115)
Location	Asakai VI (moon 14) in the Kurala constellation, along with smaller conflicts in surrounding regions, within the EVE Online virtual game universe
Result	CFC decisively defeated
Territorial changes	Liandri Covenant retained their player-controlled space station at Asakai VI-14

Belligerents
HoneyBadger Coalition: TEST Alliance; Pandemic Legion; others; Drunk 'n' Disorderly; Lost Obsession; N3; Black Legion others	Clusterfuck Coalition: Goonswarm Federation; RAZOR Alliance; others; CCDM Liandri Covenant

Commanders and leaders
Sajuk Nigarra; Sala Cameron; Hedliner; Elise Randolph; Angelus_x penifSMASH others	Admiral Dovolski; Dabigredboat; The Mittani others

Casualties and losses
1 Supercarrier; 11 Carriers; 6 Dreadnoughts numerous smaller ships	3 Titans; 5 Supercarriers; 29 Carriers; 44 Dreadnoughts numerous smaller ships
- Total forces involved 3,161 players in 270 alliances. The losses in the Battle of Asakai totaled at least 945 ships, worth over 700–800 billion in ISK, EVE Online's in-game currency. The theoretical conversion value of ships lost was estimated at approximately US$15,000–20,000.

The Battle of Asakai was a massive-scale virtual battle fought in Eve Online, a space-based massively multiplayer online role-playing game (MMORPG), which took place January 26–27, 2013. It was at that time one of the largest battles experienced in the game, involving over 3,000 real-world player accounts. It was the first battle of its scale since the game publishers introduced a time dilation feature that slows combat involving large numbers of players.

The virtual battle was fought primarily in Asakai and neighboring star systems. The conflict originated as a small-scale battle over a player-controlled space-station orbiting a moon of Asakai VI. When fleet commander Dabigredboat tried to send reinforcements via his ship's jump portal, he accidentally clicked an adjacent button in the drop-down menu, thus instead jumping his lone flagship onto the battlefield rather than a large fleet of smaller ships. The presence of such a large ship caused both sides to escalate the conflict, calling in additional reinforcements from their respective allies. The presence of Dabigredboat's large, expensive supercapital ship then shifted the tactical objective from territorial control to destruction of enemy materiel. While the fleet commander managed to extract his ship out of the system, his coalition had to commit significant assets to the battlefield to do so. Enough of the supercapital ships coming to the fleet commander's aid had their navigation systems shut down by electronic warfare such that a retreat would require significant sacrifice by leaving many behind, and so the stage was set for all sides to fully commit to the battle.

Numerous player alliances participated in the battle, the primary combatants being the player alliance Clusterfuck Coalition (CFC) against HoneyBadger Coalition (HBC), Drunk 'n' Disorderly (DND), Lost Obsession, N3, and Black Legion. After hours of fighting, HBC and its allies defeated CFC and inflicted heavy losses to CFC's fleet. Casualties for the CFC and its allies included 3 Titan-class ships, 5 supercarriers, and 29 carriers; in comparison, HBC and its allies had lost 1 supercarrier and 11 carriers. The in-game estimated cost of the battle was 700–800 billion ISK, a theoretical value of approximately US$15,000–20,000. However, Liandri Covenant, an ally of CFC and who controlled Asakai VI, retained their hold on the system and made a significant profit collecting scrap from the battlefield. Exactly one year later, the CFC again fought Pandemic Legion and N3 at the Battle of B-R5RB.

== Background ==
EVE Online is a persistent world, massively multiplayer online role playing space trading and combat game. Players control corporations and can form alliances with other players, which in turn can be formed into coalitions. Within the fictional galaxy of New Eden, star systems are assigned security ratings. In high security ("hi-sec") systems, the AI-controlled in-game security forces will swiftly punish aggressive attacks on other players, and aggressors take a large penalty to their reputation, key to non-player character interactions. In low security ("low-sec") systems, in-game security does not respond except at non-player stations and solar system interconnection gates, and player reputations are only mildly affected from attacking other players. In "null-sec" systems, areas where there is no AI security force, players can attack each other without penalty. Additionally, in high- and low-sec systems, the doomsday devices equipped on Titan-class ships (the largest ships in the game) cannot be used.^{[a]}

The Asakai solar system, located in the Black Rise region, has a low security status. At the time the Battle of Asakai commenced, a small alliance called the Liandri Covenant controlled a small player-owned station (POS) in orbit of the 14th moon of Asakai VI.^{[a]}

At the time of the Battle of Asakai, two of the largest coalitions in the game were the Clusterfuck Coalition (CFC), led by the Goonswarm Federation alliance, and HoneyBadger Coalition (HBC), led by TEST Alliance Please Ignore (TEST).^{[a]}^{[d]} Each alliance contained about 20,000 players.^{[d]} Goonswarm, formed in 2006, quickly became infamous for militarism and trolling. It became the largest faction of CFC and de facto leader. TEST formed in 2010 and quickly impressed Goonswarm, which "adopted" TEST into the alliance.^{[a]} However, relations between Goonswarm and TEST grew increasingly antagonistic, and TEST, resenting their reputation as the "pet" of Goonswarm, abandoned that faction in 2012 to join HoneyBadger Coalition (HBC).^{[a]}^{[d]} Pandemic Legion (PL) had also been friendly with Goonswarm, but, as with TEST, its relations with Goonswarm became strained. In order to create a balance of power against CFC, PL joined in alliance with TEST under the auspices of HBC.^{[a]}

In the weeks leading up to Asakai, CFC and TEST were on the brink of war. The player Montolio, the leader of TEST, reset that alliance's relations with CFC to neutral, which meant that it could freely attack CFC ships. CFC responded in kind, and Montolio severed diplomatic ties, further increasing tensions. However, PL intervened. As a major producer of technetium and a member of a technetium production cartel formed by Goonswarm and CFC, PL wished to avoid disruption to the technetium market associated with large-scale war. In face of PL's refusal to militarily support TEST if they went to war, Montolio backed down and resigned as leader of TEST.^{[a]}^{[d]} A truce was arranged where CFC and TEST agreed not to make large-scale attacks on each other's economic infrastructure.^{[b]}

== Prelude ==
In mid-January 2013, Dabigredboat, a Goonswarm fleet commander, encamped near a system controlled by the factions Drunk 'n' Disorderly (DND) and Lost Obsession. The latter alliances disliked Dabigredboat, and launched an attack for their own amusement. The Goonswarm commander received Titan-class back-up, and DND and Lost Obsession were pushed back with heavy losses. Seizing the initiative, Dabigredboat then pursued a campaign against DND and Lost Obsession in the nearby Black Rise region, in which Asakai is located.^{[a]}

As Dabigredboat conducted his search, he was contacted by Liandri Covenant ambassadors. Liandri competed against DND and Lost Obsession for control of the same systems, and offered to provide Dabigredboat with intelligence on DND activities in return for military support if DND retaliated against Liandri. Indeed, DND soon discovered Liandri's offer and began marshaling their forces for an attack. However, a spy within Liandri's ally, the Ishuk-Raata Enforcement Directive (I-RED) revealed that Liandri had a defense pact with CFC. DND informed Lost Obsession and contacted PL, which agreed to provide military support for DND and Lost Obsession, should CFC bring capital ships into a fight. Similarly, Dabigredboat learned of DND and PL's understanding, and arranged for a large CFC force to stand by.^{[a]}

Coincidental to these developments, Black Legion (BL) was performing logistical exercises with 60 dreadnoughts in a nearby region.^{[a]}

== Battle ==
The conflict began when DND sent battleships to attack Liandri's POS at Asakai VI. Liandri responded with a fleet of smaller and faster cruisers. After reinforcements from I-RED failed to shift the balance of forces, Liandri requested assistance from Dabigredboat's fleet.^{[a]} Dabigredboat, using his character Oleena Natiras, prepared to create a hyperspace bridge and commit ships to defend the Asakai system.^{[a]}^{[d]} However, instead of bridging in a fleet of sub-capital ships, Dabigredboat accidentally jumped his flagship Titan-class supercapital ship.^{[b]}^{[c]}^{[d]} The exact source of the misclick remains unclear; the game has a complex interface, and it is very easy to select the wrong button.^{[a]} Dabigredboat contends that the action — jump rather than bridge — was correct, but the target was not: they intended to jump a supercarrier from an alternate account, rather than the Titan from their primary account. Because Asakai VI is in a low-sec system, Dabrigredboat's Titan could not freely employ its doomsday device, reducing its effective firepower to that of a dreadnought, a ship costing 70 times less. Without a supporting fleet, Dabigredboat's Titan was a major liability.^{[a]}

The presence of the Titan triggered DND's defensive pact with Lost Obsession and PL. While the former responded almost immediately, PL hesitated, surprised at Dabigredboat's move. After some deliberation, the fleet commander, Headliner, committed 40 supercapital ships.^{[a]} Meanwhile, Dabigredboat came under attack from DND and Lost Obsession and requested rescue from the entire CFC navy, which committed a fleet.^{[a]}^{[b]}^{[c]} Vulnerable until help arrived, Dabigredboat attempted to extract his Titan from the rapidly expanding conflict. DND had not expected a Titan and had brought only one heavy interdictor (HIC) – a specialized ship which can prevent an enemy ship from escaping – which was quickly destroyed by the CFC fleet.^{[a]} Dabigredboat successfully warped his ship out of the conflict temporarily, and reinforcements for both sides arrived.

It rapidly became clear that the outcome of the battle would depend on HIC ships, to trap the CFC fleet in Asakai. With the only in-battle HIC destroyed, DND and Lost Obsession attempted to return their pilots to bases in the adjoining Prism system to switch craft, leaving CFC dominating the Asakai battlespace. Severely outnumbered, Hedliner called for reinforcements.^{[a]}

PL first contacted the N3 alliance, and, after obtaining confirmation of their support, reached out to TEST.^{[d]} Since Asakai was centrally located and near both CFC and HBC space, neither coalition could obtain a decisive advantage before their opponents' reinforcements arrived.^{[a]} Eve Online's publisher, CCP Games, had recently instituted a feature called time-dilation, which slows combat and movement within a star system during massive-scale player battles, in order to avoid lag and server hang.^{[b]} However, time-dilation only affects the system in which the battle takes place, which allows players outside the system to join hours into the conflict.^{[b]} Asakai was the first battle of its scale since the feature was introduced. Game time within the Asakai system dropped to 10% of normal, which provided opportunity for reinforcements to arrive. Elise Randolph, another PL commander and one with extensive contacts in other alliances, sent out a general message for assistance, promising temporary amnesty for any allied combatants. Almost all major alliances in the game responded to the call, spurred by grievances against CFC. As the size and scope of the conflict rapidly grew to full-scale war between the galaxy's major powers, Liandri retreated behind the protection of their POS, and would remain a minor player in the remainder of the fight.^{[a]}

On the DND/PL side, Hedliner divided his command into three sub-commands, sharing with two other commanders the responsibility of calling targets. At the level of individual pilots, Montolio provided recruitment and advice.^{[a]}

DND and PL returned to Asakai from Prism with HICs, and found that their resources were still insufficient. A member of Lost Obsession realized that the problem was fundamentally logistical: pilots could travel to Jita, New Eden's trading hub, purchase as many HICs as they could fit into the speediest freighter available, and park these HICs in Prism for a speedy launch into Asakai. Before the battle ended, DND and Lost Obsession had bought every HIC for sale in Jita and the Asakai environs. Some 20 HICs were lost by DND during the battle.^{[a]}

In addition to the primary conflict in Asakai, smaller battles broke out in the nearby systems as rival factions tried to intercept reinforcements heading to Asakai, to the point where time-dilation was reported in almost every adjacent system. As CFC realized that nearly everyone else in the game was travelling to Asakai in order to destroy their fleet, they began to evacuate. Harassment by the surviving HICs made extraction difficult, and PL soon destroyed 2 CFC Titans. A 500-ship strong fleet from TEST, trained in combat by Goonswarm, arrived at the site, as well as the 60 Black Legion dreadnoughts engaged in exercises nearby;^{[a]}^{[d]} these forces destroyed a third CFC Titan. DND and Lost Obsession, apprehensive of lingering near aggressive alliances such as TEST and Black Legion, likewise retreated. Pandemic Legion, seeking safety in numbers, was among the last to leave, waiting until the effects of time-dilation and lag were low enough that the entire fleet could exit as a coordinated group.^{[a]}

== Aftermath ==
Altogether, 3,131 players in over 270 alliances participated in the battle, or about 10% of online players over that period. Most fought against CFC.^{[a]}^{[d]} At peak, there were 2,754 players present at the primary system.^{[a]} Total losses were at least 945 ships. Capital ship losses were extremely one-sided: HBC lost 6 dreadnoughts, 11 carriers, and one supercarrier, whereas CFC suffered far worse: 44 dreadnoughts, 29 carriers, 5 supercarriers, and 3 Titans.^{[b]}^{[c]} Goonswarm CEO The Mittani conceded that the battle was a "complete rout" for CFC.^{[c]}^{[d]} The in-game monetary value of the losses sustained on both sides was estimated to be over 700–800 billion ISK, a theoretical value of approximately US$15,000–20,000.^{[b]}^{[c]}^{[d]} CFC losses were over 675 billion ISK, while HBC lost nearly 70 billion ISK.^{[d]} Liandri survived the battle almost intact.^{[a]}

As the conflict was triggered accidentally, no territorial gains were made by either side.^{[a]}^{[d]} The previous tension and official neutrality between CFC and HBC remained – neither faction used Asakai as casus belli.^{[d]} CFC, although severely beaten, quickly rebuilt its losses with its technetium-derived wealth. Dabigredboat was temporarily banned from piloting Titans for a few weeks.^{[a]} Exactly one year later, CFC exacted revenge on PL and N3 at the Bloodbath of B-R5RB, an even larger conflict than Asakai.

Scavengers and looters, including some parties from Liandri, scoured the wreckage floating about the battle-site. Liandri made enough profit from its salvage runs to be able to provide each alliance member with several months worth of free EVE Online subscriptions.^{[a]}

Although one of the largest battles experienced in EVE Online history at the time, there had previously been conflicts of a similar and even greater scale. In October 2010, the Battle of LXQ2-T involved over 3,110 players. Simultaneously with Asakai, another battle in a different part of the game universe destroyed over 28,000 ships. However, the latter battle was a staged corporate "battle for battle's sake" involving smaller ships, rather than a part of Eve Online's continuing politics by other means.

Most online gaming news sites covered the Battle of Asakai, bringing it to the attention of thousands of gamers.^{[a]} The battle is credited with recruiting approximately 20,000 to 50,000 new players to the game during the following month.^{[a]}
