= Expansions of Eve Online =

Eve Online
- Developer: Fenris Creations
- Publisher: Fenris Creations
- Engine: Carbon
- Platforms: Microsoft Windows macOS (via Cider); Linux (via Wine)
- Release: NA: May 6, 2003; UK: May 6, 2003; EU: May 23, 2003
- Genre: Space simulation Massively multiplayer online role-playing game
- Mode: Multiplayer

Eve Online is a player-driven persistent-world massively multiplayer online role-playing game set in a science fiction space setting. Since its release on May 6, 2003, the developer Fenris Creations, formerly known as CCP Games, has added a total of twenty-one expansions to the game. Fenris Creations provides expansions free of charge to its subscribers. This article highlights the expansions and changes introduced to the game.

== Major expansions ==
| Expansion | Release date |
|---|---|
| Castor | December 18, 2003 |
| Exodus | November 17, 2004 |
| Exodus: Cold War | June 29, 2005 |
| Red Moon Rising | December 16, 2005 |
| Revelations I | November 29, 2006 |
| Revelations II | June 19, 2007 |
| Trinity | December 5, 2007 |
| Empyrean Age | June 10, 2008 |
| Quantum Rise | November 11, 2008 |
| Apocrypha | March 10, 2009 |
| Dominion | December 1, 2009 |
| Tyrannis | May 26, 2010 |
| Incursion | November 30, 2010 |
| Incarna | June 21, 2011 |
| Crucible | November 29, 2011 |
| Inferno | May 22, 2012 |
| Retribution | December 4, 2012 |
| Odyssey | June 4, 2013 |
| Rubicon | November 19, 2013 |
| Kronos | June 3, 2014 |
| Crius | July 22, 2014 |
| Hyperion | August 26, 2014 |
| Oceanus | September 30, 2014 |
| Dominion | November 4, 2014 |
| Phoebe | November 4, 2014 |
| Rhea | December 9, 2014 |
| Proteus | January 13, 2015 |
| Tiamat | February 17, 2015 |
| Scylla | March 24, 2015 |
| Mosaic | April 28, 2015 |
| Carnyx | June 2, 2015 |
| Aegis | July 7, 2015 |
| Galatea | August 25, 2015 |
| Vanguard | September 29, 2015 |
| Parallax | November 3, 2015 |
| Citadel | April 27, 2016 |
| Ascension | November 15, 2016 |
| Lifeblood | October 24, 2017 |
| Into The Abyss | May 29, 2018 |
| Onslaught | November 13, 2018 |
| Invasion | May 28, 2019 |
| Invasion Chapter 2 | November 26, 2019 |
| Fight or Flight | January 16, 2020 |
| Invasion Chapter 3 | May 26, 2020 |
| Depths of the Abyss | September 29, 2020 |
| Uprising | August 11, 2022 |
| Viridian | June 13, 2023 |
| Havoc | November 14, 2023 |
| Equinox | June 11, 2024 |
| Revenant | November 12, 2024 |
| Legion | May 27, 2025 |
| Catalyst | November 18, 2025 |
| Cradle of War | June 6, 2026 |
| Fractured Skies | November 10, 2026 |

=== Second Genesis ===
Release date: May, 2003

=== Castor ===
Release date: December 18, 2003, Castor was the first named content release, with one of the key features being the addition of the first special Tech 2 components and ships through research agents, and improvements and tweaks to the mission system launched in earlier patches. During the pre- and post- Castor patch cycle Eve players saw the introduction of conquerable stations in 0.0 security (lawless space) systems, the introduction of the agent mission running system, and the introduction of various NPC agents to help players gain in-game currency and faction standing through missions, the EVE equivalent of quests in other MMO's.

=== Exodus ===
Release date: November 17, 2004

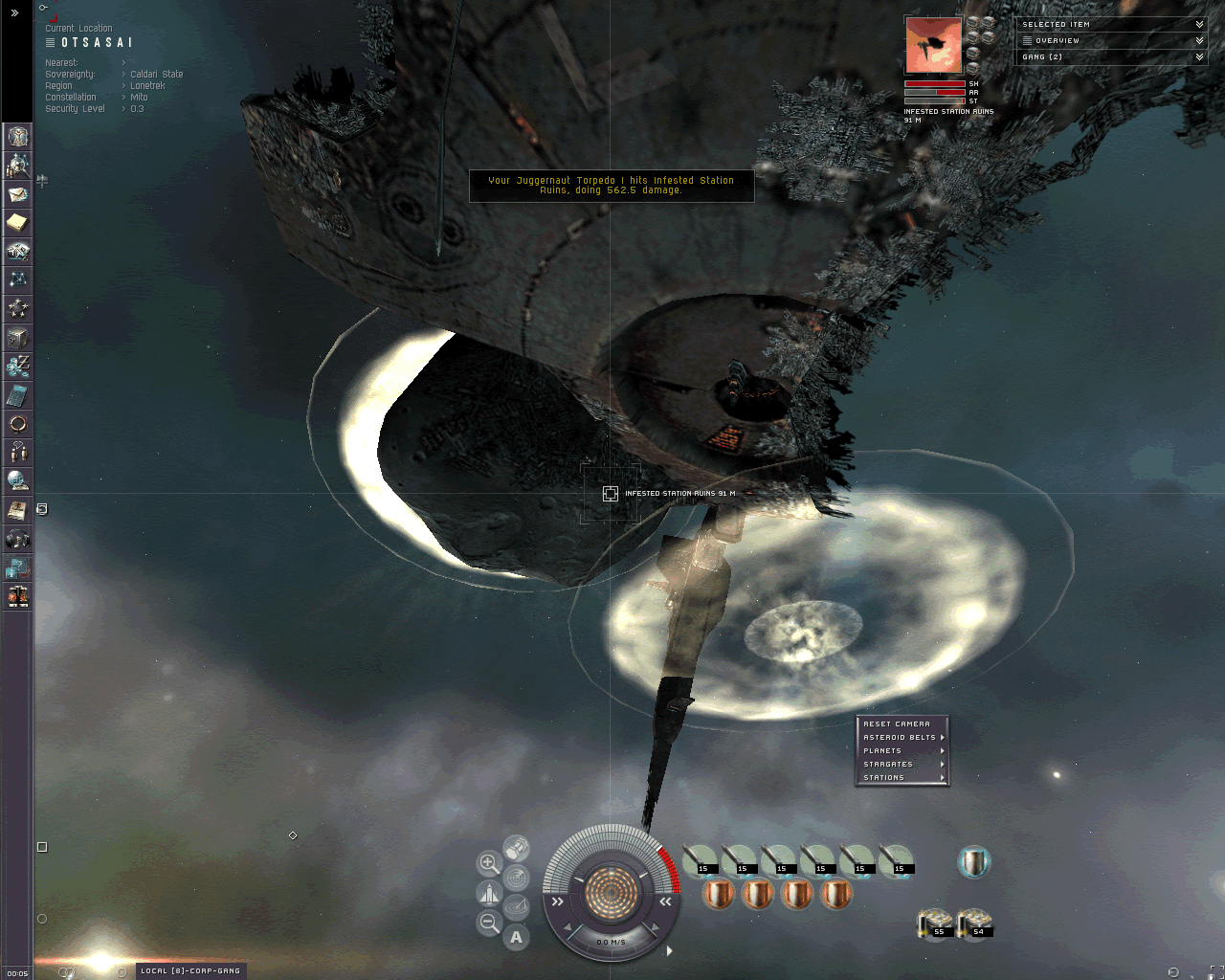
Screenshot from the expansion Exodus

Main features of Exodus were the introduction of alliances between corporations and the ability for said alliances to claim ownership of a lawless (0.0) solar systems via "player owned starbases.", which were also a major new feature in the patch. Deadspace complexes - areas in space guarded by hostile NPC's, with a chance of getting special loot - were also introduced in Exodus.

=== Exodus: Cold War ===
Release date: June 29, 2005

Cold War Edition contained an extensive new tutorial sequence and a storyline background introduction. Introduced in Cold War were "COSMOS" constellations where in-space agents began giving out story-driven missions and unique rewards. The freighter and dreadnought capital ships, full-fledged player-owned "outposts," and improved NPC pirate factions improved alliance-based gameplay. This expansion also added Unicode chat support, allowing communication in Asian, Cyrillic, and Greek languages.

=== Red Moon Rising ===
Release date: December 16, 2005

Red Moon Rising was split off from the Revelations -expansions to maintain a more regular expansion schedule. In addition to various performance optimizations and tweaks, key features associated with the RMR expansion were the introduction of 39 new ships - most notably the introduction of the carrier, mothership, and Titans-class capital ships, the expansion of the COSMOS feature from the Cold War, and the addition of four new Asian-inspired bloodlines for players to choose from: The Achura for the Caldari State, Jin-Mei for the Gallente Federation, Khanid for the Amarr Empire and the Vherokior for the Minmatar Republic.

=== Revelations I ===
Release date: November 29, 2006

Revelations was scheduled to be released in three parts under the codename "Kali". Major features of this expansion included an exploration system for scanning down various sites - combat, mining areas normally not visible, a proper contract system for trading or auctioning items, the replacement of the previous "Tech 2 research lottery" with the invention mechanic, ship customization with rigs, temporary combat boosters, and eight new regions of space to conquer.

Eve Voice was integrated as part of Revelations content patch 1.4, initially planned for release with Revelations II. Eve Voice is a voice over IP tool integrated into the Eve Online client, with software licensed by CCP from Vivox.

=== Revelations II ===
Release date: June 19, 2007

Revelations II was the second of three expansions, designed to show the increased tensions between the empires within the game universe. Several new features were introduced; including a mechanism for overloading modules and area of effect bombs. several existing features have been extended including Level 5 agents, changes to sovereignty, starbases, outposts, and balancing changes to the Amarr race. Revelations II also changed the way new players start the game, in addition to new optional tutorials the existing tutorial has been shortened and refined, and players now start in a private dungeon to allow new players to get used to the controls in a protective environment.

=== Trinity ===
Release date: December 5, 2007

Trinity was the third of the "Kali" expansions. Its biggest changes were the update of the game's graphics engine and the addition of 5 new ship classes: Heavy Interdictors, Electronic Attack Ships, Black Ops, Marauders and Jump Freighters, capable of using the jump drive to travel through low security space without using stargates. "Factional Warfare," a major addition to game mechanics, had been planned for this patch but was later announced that it would be included in a future patch, along with Ambulation (walking in stations and Full Human Representation, announced on the Eve Online Fanfest 2007). From the release of Trinity until the Apocrypha expansion CCP offered two editions of the game client; Classic for users who could not run the new graphics content on their computer, and Premium for those with a Shader Model 3-capable graphics card.

The initial launch version of the Trinity patch would under certain circumstances delete Windows XP's boot.ini file, thus rendering the operating system unbootable. Six hours after the release of this faulty patch CCP fixed the issue. While the number of affected players is unknown, 215 had specifically asked CCP for assistance.

=== Empyrean Age ===
Release date: June 10, 2008

Empyrean Age, previously named Kali 4, was the ninth expansion of Eve Online and the last one in the Kali tetralogy. CCP included the Factional Warfare in this release. In this expansion, the in-game story played a key role and the situation in the game reflects events depicted in the novel of the same title by Tony Gonzales. The expansion allowed both individual players and whole corporations to fight for the four major NPC Empires of New Eden and battle for control of regions of space.

=== Quantum Rise ===
Release date: November 11, 2008

The Quantum Rise expansion included features such as a new certificate system that allows verification of a player's proficiency in certain defined groups of skills by other players and a medal system for awards by corporations. Industrial ships were rebalanced and optimized, with addition of the Orca-class ship, "a sub-capital logistical ship with a mining command focus." The staged delivery of the expansion began with the recent implementation of new technology such as StacklessIO and EVE64 which upgraded the server hardware and streamlined communication between server and client to reduce lag. These improvements provide performance allowing for player vs. player battles with thousands of participants. Further hardware and software improvements are planned. Other features of the expansion include further graphics updates as started in the Trinity expansion; the ability for players to group their vessels' weapons for easier interaction; changes to autopilot routes and avoidance of player-defined solar systems. This patch also brought a controversial overhaul of the speed system.

=== Apocrypha ===
Release date: March 10, 2009

At Fanfest 2008 it was announced that instead of a six-month gap between expansions the subsequent expansion to Quantum Rise, Apocrypha, would be released on March 10, 2009. This expansion included a training queue, Tech 3 vessels, and exploration of uncharted space through unstable wormholes. Apocrypha has improved NPCs' artificial intelligence and has added a new NPC faction to the game, the Sleepers.

Apocrypha 1.5 was released on August 20, 2009, and considered by CCP to be a mini-expansion. CCP felt that Apocrypha was released very early for a Summer expansion, and that they had enough content ready to go for it to be classified as more than a patch. The new mini-expansion brought to EVE four more epic mission arcs, new rig sizes, specialized cargo bays for specific ships, and performance enhancements for their Factional Warfare.

Apocrypha ended official support for Linux operating systems.

=== Dominion ===
Release date: December 1, 2009

The focus of Dominion, the 12th expansion, is an overhaul in the alliance warfare sovereignty mechanics. It also includes the introduction of pirate epic arcs, an artistic redesign of planets, and a social networking platform called COSMOS (previously called New Eden). Dominion updates the In Game Browser (IGB) with Awesomium (a browser toolkit based on Chromium), allowing the IGB to behave more like a true browser and properly render HTML, javascript, and stylesheets.

=== Tyrannis ===
Release date: May 26, 2010

Tyrannis is the 13th expansion to EVE Online, and focuses heavily on planetary interaction. Players can take advantage of deposits of minerals and other raw materials found on the planets of EVE. To that end, they are given the ability to build infrastructure for harvesting, storage and processing of these materials.

The previously revealed out of game community site allowing players to interact, organize and communicate with each other through a regular web browser has been renamed EVE Gate. EVE Gate features EVE Mail, in and out of game calendars and contacts and updates for players, corporations and alliances.

CCP added hundreds of new landmarks throughout New Eden. These are points in space connected to past storyline or player events. The landmarks show up in the overview, making them more apparent and accessible than before.

The Scorpion-class battleships received a graphical overhaul featuring improved quality textures, unique detailing for each model setting them apart from the other variations. The expansion also focuses on other optimizations and improvements throughout the game, such as reducing fleet lag and load handling.

=== Incursion ===
Release Date: November 30, 2010

Incursion was announced on September 21, 2010. The expansion featured the "escalating attacks of the deadly Sansha's Nation". Players can join public fleets and co-operate to repel the Sansha incursions, receiving bounties and earning loyalty rewards. Incursion also includes many improvements as suggested by the CSM, as well as hardware upgrades, software improvements, and new cluster components aimed at increasing game performance.

Additionally, the character creator was updated with CCP's Carbon character technology for new pilot portraits. Finally, CCP added a Sansha Mothership, the Revenant, Fighter-bombers, the Noctis salvaging vessel, improvements to NPCs and their AI, new loot and rewards, storyline events and a more dynamic and simplified system for Planetary Interaction. The web-based social networking platform, EVE Gate, and the official forums received updates in the Incursion expansion as well.

CCP released the Incursion expansion in three phases: a first-step patch with a collection of player-requested improvements on November 30, a second-step patch with hidden features before December 25, and a third-step patch that included key features of the expansion (Incarna Character Creator, Sansha Incursions) on January 18, 2011. CCP has stated that this method of implementation prevents numerous bugs from infiltrating the code, and the key features "will benefit greatly from an additional level of polish."

During the second-step patch the learning skills were removed. Players were reimbursed in two ways, they got their invested skill points back which they then could redistribute to their liking or, when they hadn't already inserted the skill book, they got the NPC price back.

=== Incarna ===
Release Date: June 21, 2011

Previously known as 'Ambulation' and 'Walking In Stations', the overall Incarna feature revolves around allowing players to leave their pods and walk around in their station HQ. Currently 'face-to-face' interactions with other pilots is not possible. This feature has been in development for the majority of the life of Eve. The first phase of Incarna was released on June 21. 2011.

In the initial Incarna release all Captains Quarters were of Minmatar design. The captain's quarters are a private single player environment to introduce players to Incarna. As with the previous expansion (Incursion), this expansion will follow a segmented roll out. This allows for the testing of each major feature under the stress of the live server separately.

Incarna also included a major visual revamp of all turrets, mining lasers, tractor beams, and salvager's design and animation (including the firing animation).

One of Incarna's changes, the introduction of the "Noble Exchange" (NeX) as an in-game market allowing players to buy vanity items, received a negative reaction from players and prompted in-game riots.

=== Crucible ===
Release date: November 29, 2011

The Crucible expansion was introduced to refine the existing game aspects. New nebulae graphics, an improved UI, time dilation, and gameplay balancing were included in the expansion. CCP also added a line of third-tier battlecruisers, which can fit battleship weapons, and the remaining Captain's Quarters for the Amarr, Gallente, and Caldari races. In addition to this, the engine trail effect was reintroduced.

=== Inferno ===
Release date: April 24, 2012 (Pre-Release background enhancements), May 22, 2012 (Full release)

The 2012 summer expansion was announced with the name "Inferno" on February 22. Inferno brought a complete overhaul of the war declaration and factional warfare systems, the addition of 17 new modules and 3D models for missile launchers and missiles along with a mercenary marketplace, unified inventory, and graphical updates.

=== Retribution ===
Release date: December 4, 2012

Retribution brought a revamped bounty system, a new "Crimewatch" system, added 4 new destroyer ships and a new mining frigate, re-balanced the frigate, cruiser, and destroyer ship roles, and improved enemy AI. The expansion also added a more fine tuned bounty hunting system for new Eden, featuring new wanted icons that overlaid on Character portraits, fleets could get paid for bounties and took off the restrictions of the Bounty office making them accessible any time.

=== Odyssey ===
Release date: June 4, 2013

Odyssey revamped the exploration mechanics, added a new radial navigation tool for the UI, added new Navy Battlecruisers, rebalanced all Navy-issue class ships, moved ice belts into scannable anomalies, tweaked null sec manufacturing stations, added a security tag trade in a system where players can exchange security tags for security status, added a dual character training mechanic, added a jump-gate animation, along various visual and performance related improvements.

=== Rubicon ===
Release date: November 19, 2013

Rubicon brought major updates and changes to core game elements, the certificates system was overhauled along with the player login screen. New features included the addition of player owned high-sec customs offices, ghost sites, new hacking mechanics, warp acceleration changes, a new character selection screen, and Twitch streaming. The update is also the first step towards colonisation, as stated in CCP Seagull's vision.

=== Oceanus ===
Release date: 30 September 2014

=== Citadel ===
Release date: 27 April 2016

Citadel introduced Upwell structures (new player owned stations referred to as citadels), Force Auxiliaries (a new line of logistics themed capital ships), a rebalance of existing capital ships, new super-weapons for citadels and Titans, a unique citadel named the 'Palatine Keepstar', of which only one may exist in the game at any given time, and 'Recurring Opportunities' (a daily quest for bonus skill points feature, which has since been removed.).

Citadel was the first major expansion to Eve Online since CCP made changes to its release cadence.

=== Ascension ===
Release date: 15 November 2016

Ascension introduced the Clone States, giving the game a freemium model. Two clone states (Alpha and Omega) were created with Alpha clones being able to play for free while Omega clones would use the same subscription model as before. Ascension also saw the addition of more Upwell structures with an industrial focus called 'Engineering Complexes. Ascension saw a multitude of other changes such as an improved new player experience (NPE), a new fleet system involving Command Bursts, the Fitting Simulator, balances to the Rorqual and Tactical Destroyers as well as a few graphics and UI changes.

=== Lifeblood ===
Release date: 24 October 2017

Lifeblood introduced new player-owned structures known as refineries, designed to replace current methods of moon mining and reaction processing as well as to form the new base of operations for resource processing activities. It also introduced massive changes to moon mining, the individual and corporate mining ledger system, and resource wars, a new mode of cooperative player versus environment gameplay.

Other minor additions included new types of NPC sites, several new pirate capital ships, and changes to alpha clone ships and equipment.

=== Into The Abyss ===
Release date: 29 May 2018

Into The Abyss added a new type of encounter in Eve Online called 'Abyssal Deadspace' along with new ships, weapons, and technologies. The update also featured improvements to the previously outdated UI and UX of Planetary Interaction.

=== Onslaught ===
Release date: 13 November 2018

Onslaught introduced new Upwell anchorable structures for Cynosural Beacon, Cynosural jammer, and Jump Gates, replacing the previous POS-based structures. The update added new Triglavian destroyer and battlecruiser ships, and both cooperative and PvP Abyssal encounters were introduced.

=== Invasion ===
Release date: 28 May 2019

Also known as The Triglavian Invasion, The Invasion would blur the lines between known space and Abyssal Deadspace showing that the systems that were affected by the invasion would exhibit strange environmental effects. The update added new Triglavian Tech II ships, New Mutaplasmids that would directly affect damage control units and assault damage, and Ancillary shield boosters and armor repairers. The update also featured a redesign to the Agency, put the EVE 64-Bit client to open beta, and added a balance to the War Declaration system.″

=== Invasion Chapter 2 ===
Release date: 26 November 2019

Invasion Chapter 2 continued the story arc revolving around the Triglavians which began in chapter 1. Players were allowed to choose sides during engagements between the Empires and the Triglavian Collective. The update added the Zirnitra Triglavian dreadnought class ship. This ship brought new skills that needed to be trained before it could be piloted by players. This chapter of the Invasion expansion also brought with it other new features too, including Shareable Bookmarks. This new addition allowed players to share specific locations in New Eden with alliance members and anyone else they choose, with control over access and duration. The Mimesis Implant set was also added to the Loyalty Points store.

=== Fight or Flight ===
Release date: 16 January 2020

This was the debut quadrant release for EVE Online, themed around PvP. The components of the quadrant were tied together, for example, only the ships affected by the heavy missile balance changes were allowed to enter sites that were part of the in-game Dragonaur Blitz event. The event was also used to introduce the Nirvana Faction Implants. Other in-game events during the quadrant, such as the Skilling Spree and Skilling is Just A Means, encouraged players to engage in PvP and PvE rewarding efforts with skill points. The Needlejack Filaments, capable of transporting a group of players into a random solar system, were reintroduced after their initial introduction as RDLF-09 Filaments during the 'Naughty or Nice' event. The quadrant rounded out with the Loyalty to Low Sec update which included the frigate escape bay mechanic, allowing players whose battleship was destroyed to continue fighting via a frigate that was stored within the battleship. PvP was encouraged in low security space through increased loot drops and faster warp speeds, this event bridged into the second quadrant.

=== Invasion Chapter 3 ===
Release date: 26 May 2020

Invasion Chapter 3 was the culmination of the Triglavian invasion storyline. Players faced a choice between siding with EDENCOM, a defensive organization, or the Triglavian Collective, an alien force seeking to claim star systems. The expansion introduced dynamic system invasions, allowing players to influence the outcomes and determine which systems would permanently align with either faction. The result of these battles reshaped the map of New Eden, with several systems becoming "Pochven," a new and dangerous region controlled by the Triglavians.

=== Depths of the Abyss ===
Release date: September 29, 2020

Depths of the Abyss expanded on the Abyssal Deadspace content introduced in previous updates. It brought new challenges and rewards for players exploring these dangerous, time-limited dungeons. The update added deeper tiers of Abyssal Deadspace, new encounters, and exclusive loot, pushing players to test their limits in increasingly hostile environments.

=== Uprising ===
Release date: August 11, 2022

Frontlines feature in Factional Warfare concentrates battles on the borders of empires. These warzones have different operational states with varying rewards for participation in Faction Warfare.

=== Viridian ===
Release date: June 13, 2023

Viridian focused on empowering corporations and alliances with new tools to manage their operations and grow their influence. The expansion introduced additional customization options for player structures, new ships, and updates to the game’s social systems to encourage collaboration and community-building within New Eden.

=== Havoc ===
Release date: November 14, 2023

Havoc introduced a new era of rebellion and chaos in New Eden, focusing on pirate factions and criminal activities. Players gained opportunities to align with outlaw groups, participate in smuggling operations, and engage in skirmishes outside traditional empire space. The expansion brought new gameplay mechanics, including tools for sabotage and black-market trading, offering a darker, more treacherous side to EVE Online.

=== Equinox ===
Release date: June 11, 2024

The Equinox expansion introduces major enhancements to nullsec gameplay, enabling capsuleers to harvest planetary and lunar resources through new Upwell Consortium structures. It includes a revamped sovereignty system, customizable ship SKINs using the new SKINR tool, and improvements to corporate projects and UI. Additionally, updates to the EVE Vanguard FPS mode provide new maps, adaptive weaponry, and limited-time events.

=== Revenant ===
Release date: November 12, 2024

Revenant builds upon the escalating Drifter conflict and Deathless storyline, offering capsuleers new tools for combat and resource control. Mercenary dens—deployable structures anchored around temperate planets—create lucrative skirmish opportunities and produce encrypted infomorphs, which can be exchanged for advanced Deathless technology. The expansion also introduces the Tholos (destroyer) and Cenotaph (battlecruiser), both equipped with damage-over-time capabilities and cloaking technology for ambush tactics. Enhanced Corporation Projects and SKINR customization options empower player groups with streamlined ship replacement mechanics and the ability to craft unique nanocoating designs, further emphasizing teamwork and individuality in New Eden. A concurrent public event expands ground combat content, blending the space and planet-side experiences within the EVE Online Universe.

=== Legion ===
Release date: May 27, 2025

The Legion expansion was announced during the EVE keynote at Fanfest 2025. Legion ushers in a new era in New Eden – one built on unity, ambition, influence, and the strength of capsuleers working together. Introducing Freelance Jobs that allow player-run corporations to create tasks open to pilots outside of their own ranks, an expanded palette for corporation customisation, and new sovereignty upgrades. Two new warships, the Babaroga (marauder) and Sarathiel (dreadnought), are added to the game.

=== Catalyst ===
Release date: November 18th, 2025

Catalyst introduces the ore "prismaticite", which can be mined by industrial ships in new "Phased Asteroid" sites. Mining UI/UX improvements are added, including a dynamic overlay with colour-coded visual indicators. New data visualisation methods are implemented for the 2D and 3D maps of New Eden, allowing for better comprehension of jump ranges, fuel consumption, and fatigue incurred after a jump. Five new ships are added to the game: The Pioneer (mining destroyer), Outrider (command destroyer), Venture Consortium Issue (mining frigate), Pioneer Consortium Issue (mining destroyer), and Odysseus (command ship). A rework reduces build costs and times for carriers, as well measures made to tackle the common strategy of using carrier fighters at extreme ranges known as "skynetting".

=== Cradle of War ===
Release date: June 9th, 2026

Military campaigns are added, giving narrative impact with larger goals and rewards for activities previously limited to Faction Warfare. Titles and achievements give capsuleers an opportunity to personalise their in-game profiles. A new non-PvP starter space "Exordium" is added to the game, adding the first ever space to EVE Online where PvP is impossible, rather than heavily punished. A new Epic Arc for each empire is added to allow players to experience key narrative events already described in the game's lore. The command carrier class of ship is added to the game, with each empire receiving a ship of this class using the same in-game model as the regular carrier. Four new navy faction destroyers are added, each a variant of existing destroyers.

=== Fractured Skies ===
Release date: November 10th, 2026

Fractured Skies adds four new navy attack battlecruisers based on existing attack battlecruiser models. New synchroniser rigs are added, giving ships a bonus when fit with modules that match the rig's designation. Level 1 missions are given a visual modernisation, reducing clutter and bringing the missions graphics up to date with new content. A new HUD is added as a feature preview, giving players the option to test it out and provide feedback in anticipation of its permanent addition to the game. New achievements and military campaigns are added, further fleshing out the additions of the Cradle of War expansion. For the first time, the actions of EVE Vanguard players will influence players of EVE Online, spawning SARO Black Sites when expeditions and contracts are completed.

== Changes to expansions ==
On May 6, 2014, at their yearly Fanfest convention, CCP announced the move from the current development cycle of two expansions per year, to ten expansions per year on a rapid release cycle of six weeks per expansion. In September 2015, CCP announced that while the five-week release cycle would be maintained for content such as quality of life changes, ship balance changes, visual upgrades, new ship skins, and storyline developments, they would also be bringing back expansions:

An expansion will be a set of big, connected features that both make impactful change on EVE, and make a statement about what kind of game EVE is. Second, there won't be a fixed number of them per year, but rather we will announce when we have one in the making and what the main features are.

In early 2020 CCP Games announced they would be splitting the EVE Online year into four quadrants. Each quadrant would have an overarching theme associated with it that allowed for releases, events, offers, and more to exist within a given theme for that period of time. Each Quadrant would contain seasonal events, balance changes and game health improvements, permanent meta changes, challenges, and rewards that could be themed, for example, around a particular style of gameplay, or any aspect of EVE. The name of the first quadrant for 2020 was 'Fight or Flight' and was themed around PvP.
