= EVE: Conquests =

EVE: Conquests is a 2009 board game based on Eve Online. It was published by CCP Games.

== Gameplay ==
EVE: Conquests is a game in which a two‑hour strategy game set in a brutal far‑future universe has 2–4 players lead rival galactic empires in a struggle for political influence and planetary domination through careful resource management and calculated warfare.

== Reviews ==
- Black Gate
- Rebel Times #23
