= Battle of B-R5RB =

Massive virtual battle in the Eve Online game

- A screenshot of the battle
Date	January 27–28, 2014
Location	Eve Online virtual game universe (centered in the system B-R5RB, smaller battles and skirmishes throughout)
Result	Decisive CFC and Russian alliances victory
Territorial changes	CFC and Russian alliances capture the B-R5RB system; N3 Coalition, Pandemic Legion, and allies temporarily withdrew from the southeast region

Belligerents
Clusterfuck Coalition (CFC); Halloween Coalition (Russian Alliances)	N3 Coalition; Pandemic Legion

Commanders and leaders
Lazarus Telraven; The Mittani; Sort Dragon; Mister Vee; Vily; Elo Knight; Wrik Hoover; Volods	Manfred Sideous; Vince Draken; Grath Telkin; Elise Randolph; Makalu Zarya; Travis Musgrat

Strength
~3670 capital ships; ~143 Titans; ~273 Supercarriers; ~817 Dreadnoughts; ~233 Carriers; thousands of sub-capital ships	~1616 capital ships; ~72 Titans; ~172 Supercarriers; ~355 Dreadnoughts; ~414 Carriers; thousands of sub-capital ships

Casualties and losses
16 Titans; 2 Supercarriers; 106 Dreadnoughts; 5 Carriers; ~1900 sub-capital ships	59 Titans; 12 Supercarriers; 259 Dreadnoughts; 112 Carriers; ~1250 sub-capital ships
- Total forces involved 7,548 participants. Damages amounted to an approximate real-currency value of $300,000–330,000 USD.

The Battle of B-R5RB or the Bloodbath of B-R5RB (/ˈbiː tæk ɑːr faɪv ɑːr ˈbiː/) was a massive-scale virtual battle fought in the MMORPG space game Eve Online in January 2014 (YC 116 in-game), possibly the largest player-versus-player battle in gaming history at the time. The 21-hour-long conflict pitted the Clusterfuck Coalition and Russian alliances (CFC/Rus) against the N3 Coalition and Pandemic Legion alliance (N3/PL), and involved over 7,548 player characters with a maximum of 2,670 players in the B-R5RB system at one time. The in-game cost of the losses totaled over 11 trillion Interstellar Kredit (ISK), an estimated theoretical real-world value of US$300,000 to $330,000 (equivalent to between US$402,454 and $442,700 in 2025), as derived from the contemporaneous market value of PLEX, an item purchasable with real currency that can be redeemed either for subscription time or traded for in-game currency.

Part of a larger conflict known as the Halloween War, the fight started after a single player controlling a space station in the N3/PL-controlled star system B-R5RB accidentally failed to make a scheduled in-game routine maintenance payment, which made the star system open to capture. Being a key staging area used by N3/PL in the war, the CFC and Russian coalitions began pouring players into the system in a swift offensive, and N3/PL moved in a large fleet of players as a response. A massive battle erupted in the system, and numerous smaller engagements occurred throughout the game universe as players attempted to block reinforcements from joining the battle. CFC/Rus gained a clear win by inflicting heavy losses on N3/PL and successfully capturing B-R5RB. The losses totaled 576 capital ships, including 75 Titans (the largest ships available to players), along with thousands of smaller vessels.

To commemorate the sheer size and cost of the battle, the game's creators, CCP Games, erected a permanent monument in the system B-R5RB named "The Titanomachy", consisting of non-salvageable capital ship wrecks.

== Background ==
Eve Online is an MMORPG space game in which players engage in a variety of activities including mining, piracy, manufacturing, trading, exploration, and combat. The size, scale, and intricacy of the game world and its economy and politics means that accomplishing anything consequential typically involves joint efforts by many players over days, weeks, even months and years. Players may form corporations (clans, guilds or alliances in other video games), and these corporations in turn can formally join in alliance with other corporations. Many of these alliances create informal coalitions to work toward common goals and fight competing alliances. Despite the prevalence of coalitions in the game, there is no formal in-game mechanic providing for these "super-alliances". The Halloween War was a conflict in the game universe which started around Halloween in late October, which pitted the player alliance coalitions CFC and Russian – the latter so-called because of the real-world nationality of many of the players – and their allies against the N3 and Pandemic Legion player coalitions and their allies. B-R5RB, located in the Immensea region, served as the staging ground for all Pandemic Legion fleets. A few days before the fighting in B-R5RB, the CFC and Russian coalition suffered a decisive loss to N3 and Pandemic Legion forces in the Battle of HED-GP in the Catch region, due to the N3/PL's "Wrecking Ball" formation.

Between the coalitions involved, the Battle of B-R5RB involved 717 player corporations and 55 alliances. In the Clusterfuck (CFC) and Russian (Rus) coalitions, RAZOR Alliance, under the command of user Lazarus Telraven, was a major participant within CFC, as was the Goonswarm Federation and Stainwagon, and within Rus, Solar Fleet, Darkness of Despair, and Against ALL Authorities were majorly involved alliances. On the side of the Pandemic Legion and N3 coalitions, Northern Coalition and Nulli Secunda were two of the major alliances involved.

In Eve Online, players can claim sovereignty over some star systems if they make payments (typically at that time about 1 billion of the in-game currency Interstellar Kredits) to CONCORD, the in-game, non-playable security force, and claim a star system using a Territorial Claim Unit. Sovereignty grants the controlling player "reinforcement timers", that is, real time waiting periods of several days designed to allow defenders to rally. Without sovereignty, or if, as was the case with B-R5RB, sovereignty is lost, the star system is vulnerable to immediate attack from hostile players.

== Battle ==
=== Prelude ===
On January 27, 2014 (YC 116 in-game), the one-year anniversary of the immense Battle of Asakai, player corporation "H A V O C", a member of Nulli Secunda, mistakenly failed to make a scheduled payment to CONCORD. The user Manfred Sideous of Pandemic Legion claimed that he had enough ISK in his holding corporation wallet and had autopay checked, raising the possibility of sabotage or an in-game bug.

=== Outbreak of conflict ===
An enemy scout discovered the Nulli Secunda alliance quietly attempting to regain control with units called Territorial Claim Units (TCU), which are used for announcing control over a star system. Lazarus Telraven, a fleet commander of the player coalition Rus, made a decision to launch an early attack instead of waiting until his coalition's fleet scheduled muster at 14:00 Eve time (which is equivalent to GMT). His fleet destroyed the enemy TCUs, and RAZOR Alliance, one of the player alliances under Telraven's command, took the station and set up its own TCU in order to establish control of the star system. At around 14:00, with an hour remaining before Nulli Secunda could regain control, the CFC and Russian coalition sent a capital fleet to the station. Capturing the B-R5RB system would enable the CFC and Russian coalition to trap Pandemic Legion assets, including hundreds of capital and sub-capital ships, thus preventing those ships from joining the war. CFC and Russian coalition forces scrambled to gain control of the system, with thousands of players logging on and preparing their fleets. Lazarus Telraven had command of about 1,000 players with some 255 ships. His two fellow commanders, Mister Vee and Vily, were at their real-world jobs and thus Telraven had sole command of the fleet.

=== Battle for B-R5RB ===
Pandemic Legion and N3 moved to retake the system from CFC and Rus, but the Russians destroyed all Territorial Claim Units anchored in the system. N3/PL then deployed their super-carrier and carrier fleet in the "Wrecking Ball" formation just off the system's space station, a formation which had previously defeated the CFC and Russian alliance. As the conflict was a surprise and occurred on a Monday workday, CFC and Rus decided to take advantage and gain field superiority before N3 and PL could respond and so deployed their entire capital fleet to the system. Meanwhile, they deployed their sub-capital fleets to N3 staging systems, including I-NGI8 and GXK-7F, to delay any reinforcements. N3/Pandemic Legion ships finally arrived at around 15:30.

Each side then attempted to rush all available pilots into the system, and the game's time dilation software engaged. Time dilation is a game feature created by developer CCP Games to handle heavy loads on the game server without the game lagging or disconnecting players. In time dilation, the game slows to ten percent normal speed, with each second of game time displaying as ten seconds of real time. The two sides traded Titan kills every hour, when their Doomsday weapons could fire again, and the system became filled with warp disruption bubbles, making extraction difficult. For a while neither side gained any real advantage, though CFC/Rus managed to on-line their Territorial Claim Units and held a slight lead in the number of enemy Titans destroyed. Throughout the engagement, related battles played out across the entire game universe as fleets tried to block reinforcements, destroy fleeing capitals and super-capitals, or trap pilots attempting to enter the fray.

The tide of the battle started to turn when Manfred Sideous, the initial N3/PL fleet commander, handed control to Vince Draken, CEO of the player alliance Northern Coalition. Vince Draken managed to concentrate fire on and destroy several CFC/Rus Titans and also forced some additional Russian Titans to leave the system with depleted shields and armor. However, N3/PL overestimated their success and began to focus their attacks on the Titan belonging to Sort Dragon, the commander of all remaining Russian forces in the field. This Titan had very high damage resistance, and Sort Dragon drew upon his entire fleet to assist in repairing it, enabling it to hold out much longer than most other Titans up to that point. By the time his Titan fell, the CFC/Rus had managed to destroy five N3/PL Titans, putting the alliance well ahead. James Carl, a member of the N3/Pandemic Legion coalition, reported to the Associated Press that "It looks like CFC is winning, but we're hoping now that all of our US players are online, we'll turn the tide". But when the US time zone players logged on and reinforcements became available, PL did not see the numbers they had expected, and the CFC blockaded adjacent systems to prevent them joining the battle. Eventually, N3/PL could no longer destroy any Titans, and ordered a retreat. They switched their fire onto CFC/Rus's Dreadnoughts in an attempt to take out as many ships as possible during retreat. Due to their spy network under Intelligence Commander Tobias Deidorm, CFC knew that N3/PL had ordered a retreat and deployed Interdictors and Heavy Interdictors to prevent the withdrawal. N3/PL lost several more Titans, Super Carriers, and Capitals in the extraction, with many trapped by the warp disruption bubbles strewn throughout the battle area. The battle definitively ended when the Eve universe went offline for its regular daily maintenance at 11:00 UTC on January 28, disconnecting all players.

== Aftermath ==
Over 7,548 unique characters participated in the overall battle, of which 6,058 participated directly in the B-R5RB system with a maximum of 2,670 in system at the same time. These numbers included 717 unique player corporations and involved 55 unique player alliances. Joystiq called the battle potentially the largest recorded PvP battle in any game to date. On the CFC/Rus side, approximately 3670 capital ships were involved, including roughly 143 Titans, 273 Supercarriers, 817 Dreadnoughts, and 233 Carriers, as well as thousands of sub-capital ships. N3/PL brought against that about 1616 capital ships, including around 72 Titans, 172 Supercarriers, 355 Dreadnoughts, and 414 Carriers, and thousands of sub-capital ships. The 21-hour-long conflict resulted in the loss of 75 Titans, 13 supercarriers, 370 Dreadnoughts, and 123 Carriers, along with thousands of smaller ships and innumerable fighters and drones. N3 and Pandemic Legion lost 59 Titans, while CFC and the Russian coalitions lost only 16. CFC/Rus also lost 2 Supercarriers, 106 Dreadnoughts, 5 Carriers, and over 1900 sub-capital ships, while N3/PL lost 12 Supercarriers, 259 Dreadnoughts, 112 Carriers, and over 1250 sub-capital ships.

An estimated 11 trillion ISK in assets was lost during the battle, and media outlets reported the battle as the biggest and most expensive in Eve Online's history at the time, estimating that the battle cost US$300,000–330,000 in real-world money. This estimate comes from a figure listed in the official report by CCP Games, which the report based on a theoretical conversion of pilot license extensions, or PLEX, into real-world USD. While direct conversion of real currency into ISK, or vice versa, is strictly prohibited, and PLEX units are purchasable in-game, additional PLEX units can be purchased for US$20, and it is from this theoretical real-world value that the estimated dollar amounts lost in the battle are drawn. However, this does not mean this amount of real-world money was expended, as many ships were purchased through in-game currency or corporation assets.

Eyjólfur Guðmundsson, an economist hired by CCP Games to oversee Eve Online's economy, stated:

To me, as an economist, that doesn't really matter. In both cases this is economical value that is created by people's work, either in real life or in virtual life. They put their blood, sweat and tears into making stuff so they can have an advantage in a battle, because in this battle like in any other battle in meat worlds, in real life, it is the resources you have available.

He further commented that, as an economist, he enjoys the destruction wrought from such battles, because "war in Eve is the consumption of Eve Online." The tremendous removal of value due to B-R5RB results in longstanding economic impact, as ships would need to be replaced, minerals mined, and people reorganized and trained. In his opinion, this is what keeps the Eve game universe alive and healthy. However, a few days later, Guðmundsson reported that there was no rush on minerals. While trading for all the key low end minerals necessary for rebuilding had increased in volume, sometimes as high as 100%, the impact on price was modest, and on the overall game economy the impact was minimal.

Alexander Gianturco, who goes by the in-game character The Mittani, CEO of Goonwaffe (the largest corporation in the Goonswarm Federation alliance and hence the largest alliance in the CFC), reported to Polygon near the end of the battle:

As vengeance for [the battle of Asakai] goes, it's somewhat ironic; our forces lost three Titans and seven supercarriers last year in Asakai, and lost the battle. This year we've killed 40+ hostile Titans and we have seven more hours of killing before downtime.

Also near the end of the battle, Ali Aras wrote on TheMittani.com, an Eve Online news website run by the CFC, that the "kills made here decide not only this war, but the next, and the next after that". He also highlighted some of the economic repercussions, including the increase in the price of Tritanium, which he viewed as an upshot of "the flurry of industrial production to come".

Following the Battle of B-R5RB, Pandemic Legion withdrew from the Southeast theater and formed an agreement with the CFC which allowed them to evacuate billions of assets from the B-R5RB system. Other N3 forces retreated in from the south, and in the following few days CFC alliances managed to capture a total of 23 systems in the regions Immensea, Catch, Tenerifis, and Feythabolis from N3/Pandemic Legion alliances. The CFC then withdrew from the southeast theater. In the weeks after, the Russian bloc suffered internal troubles, allowing N3 to regain all of the territory lost after B-R5RB and conquer most of the Russian bloc's territory. In the longer term, B-R5RB established CFC, later re-branded as The Imperium, as the predominant superpower in Eve Online, with little serious resistance challenging the coalition for the next two years.

Due to the media attention given to the battle, it, like Asakai the year before, inspired thousands of people to join the game. In the 30 days after B-R5RB, new player subscriptions increased 10 percent (although most players quit after one month of gameplay). This resulted in a minimum of US$50,000 in additional revenue for CCP Games.

== Scale ==
The total number of players in the B-R5RB system peaked at 2,670, which was less than the previously largest battle in Eve at 6VDT-H, which had 4,070 players in the main battle. B-R5RB however had many smaller related battles playing out, meaning it involved more players in total. The number of players was later surpassed by the battle of 9-4RP2, with over 6,000 players in system and many more in related battles. However, due to technical issues with the larger battle, B-R5RB remains the second largest battle in the Eve Online universe in terms of resources destroyed. An even larger battle at FWST-8, in 2020, saw 8,825 players participating in total, with a peak of 6,557 located in the system, breaking two Guinness World Records for the "Largest Multiplayer Videogame PVP Battle" and the "Most Concurrent Participants in a Multiplayer Videogame PvP Battle", making it the current largest battle in the game in terms of player count. B-R5RB remained the most expensive battle. However, on December 31, 2020, the Massacre at M2-XFE broke the record of largest total destruction in a single battle, costing about US$378,012 in player investments. The scale of the B-R5RB and others in the Eve Online universe have sparked the development of in-game historiographies and public history. This and the scale of its economy, which has been academically studied, exemplifies how Eve Online transcends typical classification as an MMORPG.

== Commemoration ==
Once the game went into downtime, developer CCP Games announced that it would create an in-game monument in the B-R5RB star system to commemorate the battle. "Titanomachy" was created using brand-new Titan wreck models introduced with Eve Online: Rubicon's 1.1 release which came out immediately following the battle. The name references both the Titan-class ships used in the game and the Titanomachy, a war in Greek mythology between the Titans and the Olympian gods. CCP Games posted on the Eve Online website that they planned to install "Titanomachy" during downtime of January 31, and were "hard at work placing the wrecks in a hauntingly beautiful arrangement". Placed around the seventh planet in the B-R5RB system, the installation is "off grid" from the space station. CCP Games stated:

Thereafter, any player who plays [Eve Online] can make the dangerous pilgrimage there and marvel at the scope of destruction. We expect some of the 'travel' bloggers to do full write-ups on it almost immediately and [Eve Online] videographers to make some moving tributes as well.

The history of the battle and the installed memorial was labeled by historian Daniel Fandino "must-see" for players as well as the general public who might otherwise not be interested in the game. In 2021, PC Gamer included the Titanomachy as one of the "coolest Eve Online locations you should visit at least once", and called the landmark one of the most important in the game's history.

== See also ==
- Battle of Asakai
