= Eve Online =

2003 massively multiplayer online video game

- Developer: Fenris Creations
- Publishers: NA: Simon & Schuster Interactive; UK: Crucial Entertainment (2003); Fenris Creations (2004–present); Atari (2009 retail release)
- Producer: Andie Nordgren
- Engine: Carbon
- Platforms: Windows macOS (Note: Natively supported again since October 2021); Linux (Note: Official native support ended in March 2009)
- Release: Windows: NA: May 6, 2003; UK: May 6, 2003; EU: May 23, 2003; macOS: WW: October 13, 2021; Linux, macOS: WW: November 6, 2007; (Note: Official native support ended in March 2009, was later reinstaed for macOS)
- Genres: Space trading and combat, massively multiplayer online role-playing game
- Mode: Multiplayer

Eve Online (stylized EVE Online) is a space-based, persistent-world massively-multiplayer online role-playing game (MMORPG) developed and published by Fenris Creations (formerly CCP Games). Players of Eve Online can participate in a number of in-game professions and activities, including mining, piracy, manufacturing, trading, exploration, and combat (both player versus environment [PVE] and player versus player [PVP]). The game contains a total of 7,805 star systems that can be visited by players.

The game is renowned for its scale and complexity in regard to player interactions. In its single, shared game world, players engage in unscripted economic competition, warfare, and political schemes with other players. The Bloodbath of B-R5RB, a battle involving thousands of players in a single star system, took 21 hours and was recognized as one of the largest and most expensive battles in gaming history. Eve Online was exhibited at the Museum of Modern Art with a video including the historical events and accomplishments of the playerbase.

Eve Online was released in North America and Europe in May 2003. It was published from May to December 2003 by Simon & Schuster Interactive in North America and by Crucial Entertainment in the United Kingdom, after which CCP purchased the rights and began to self-publish via a digital distribution scheme. On January 22, 2008, it was announced that Eve Online would be distributed via Steam. On March 10, 2009, the game was again made available in boxed form in stores, released by Atari. In February 2013, Eve Online reached over 500,000 subscribers. On November 11, 2016, Eve Online added a limited free-to-play version.

== Background ==
Set more than 21,000 years in the future, the background story of Eve Online explains that humanity, having used up most of Earth's resources through centuries of explosive population growth, began colonizing the rest of the Milky Way. As on Earth, this expansion also led to competition and fighting over available resources, but everything changed with the discovery of a natural wormhole leading to an unexplored galaxy subsequently dubbed "New Eden". Dozens of colonies were founded, and a structure, a gate of sorts (which bears the inscription "EVE" on the New Eden side), was built to stabilize the wormhole that linked the colonies of New Eden with the rest of human civilization. However, when the wormhole unexpectedly collapsed, it destroyed the gate as well as the connection between the colonies of New Eden and the Milky Way. Cut off from the rest of humanity and supplies from Earth, the colonies of New Eden were left starving and disconnected from one another; many died out entirely. Over the millennia the descendants of the surviving colonists managed to rebuild their own societies, but by this time the memories and knowledge of humanity's origins, of Earth and the Milky Way galaxy, as well as the history of the settling of New Eden, were lost; what little information that survived transmission over the generations was misunderstood, lost in translation, or consigned to mythology. Five major distinct societies rose to prominence from the surviving colonies, all growing into interstellar spaceflight-capable civilizations. The states based around these societies make up the five major empires in Eve Online: the Amarr Empire, the Caldari State, the Gallente Federation, the Minmatar Republic, and the Jove Empire.

=== Races ===
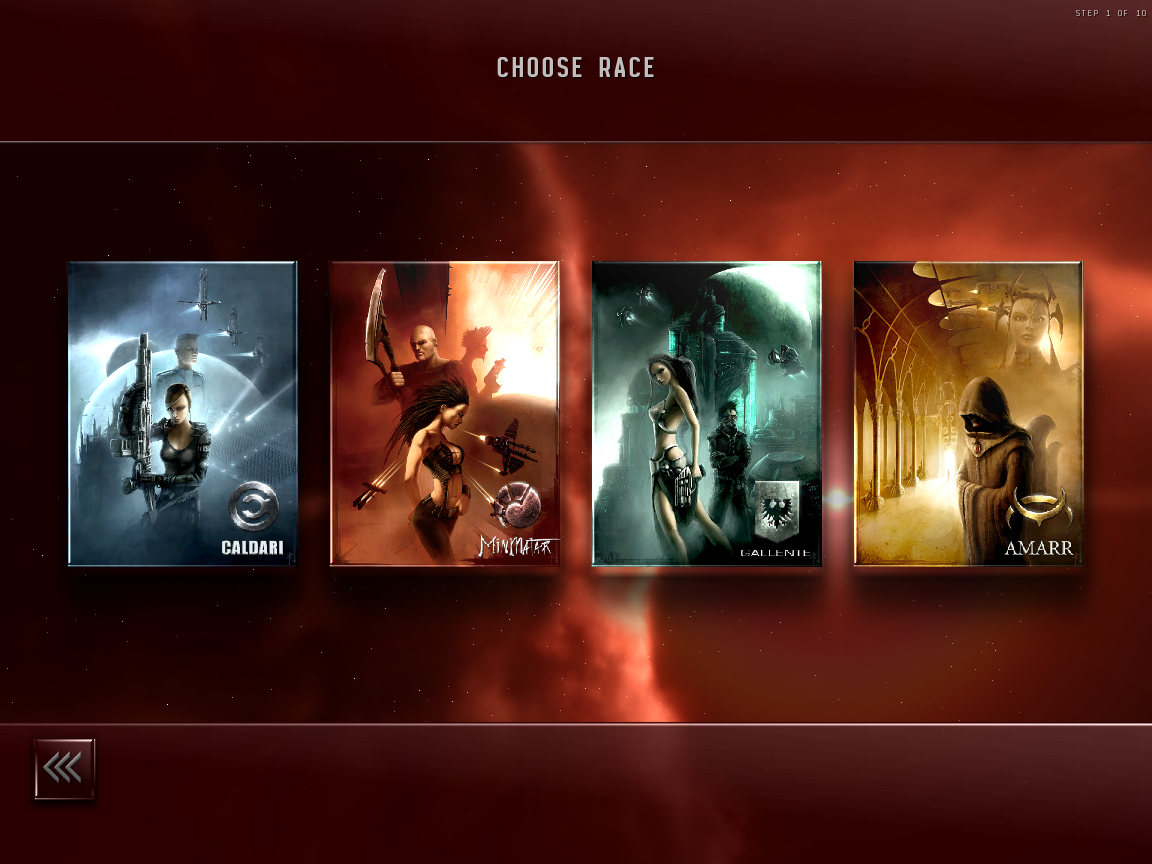
The four playable races in Eve Online as seen on the character creation menus

The Amarr, a militantly theocratic empire, was the first of the playable races to rediscover faster-than-light travel. In terms of physical proximity, the space occupied by this society is physically nearest to the demolished EVE gate. Armed with this new technology and the strength of their faith in their god, the Amarr expanded their empire by conquering and enslaving several races, including the Minmatar race, who had only just begun colonizing other planets. Generations later, after the intense culture shock of encountering the Gallente Federation, and in the wake of a disastrous attempted invasion of Jovian space, many Minmatar took the opportunity to rebel and successfully overthrew their enslavers, forming their own government. However, much of their population remain enslaved by the Amarr, and some, having adopted the Amarrian religion and sided with their masters during the revolution, were released from bondage and incorporated into the Empire as commoners in the Ammatar Mandate. The free Minmatar Republic, taking as inspiration the ideals and practices of the Gallente Federation, is presently a strong military and economic power actively seeking the emancipation of their brethren and all other slaves.

The Gallente and the Caldari homeworlds are situated in the same star system. The Gallente homeworld was originally settled by descendants of the French colonists of Tau Ceti; Caldari Prime on the other hand was purchased by a multinational megacorporation that began to terraform it. The terraforming of Caldari Prime was incomplete at the time of the EVE wormhole's collapse, hence the planet remained environmentally inhospitable for millennia. The Gallente restored themselves to a high-functioning technological society some hundred years before the Caldari, building the first lastingly democratic republic of New Eden in the form of the Gallente Federation. Originally the Caldari composed a member race within the Federation, but cultural animosity between the two peoples spiralled into a war during which the Caldari seceded from the Federation to found their own Caldari State. The war lasted 93 years, with neither nation able to overwhelm the other. The planet Caldari Prime was initially retained by the Gallente Federation during the war, and did not become part of the new Caldari State. A Caldari offensive later managed to recapture their lost homeworld, a fact which was viewed with abhorrence by the Gallente, who saw the presence of a significant Caldari fleet about the planet as a mass hostage taking. After 5 years of Caldari control over Caldari Prime, the Gallente launched their own offensive to retake the planet through the destruction of the Caldari Leviathan-Class Titan Shiigeru. They successfully destroyed Shiigeru, although the planet is now demilitarized and separated into districts split between Caldari and Gallente control.

Both the Gallente Federation and Caldari State are economy- and trade-oriented nations. However, the Gallente favor liberal economic policies, encourage individual entrepreneurship and social democracy, and maintain a progressive approach to social welfare, whereas the Caldari State is organized as a form of statist corporatocracy; the Caldari State itself is owned by and operated on behalf of a few trust-like megaconglomerates. The Gallente Federation's official policies regarding multiculturalism and encouragement of diversity attract many immigrants to Gallente space; a third of all ethnic Minmatars reside as citizens there. As the Caldari did not share this enthusiasm for diversity with the Gallente, the Caldari State at the time of its formation found itself at a relative population deficit compared to its Gallente adversary; rather than encourage massive immigration to and diversity within the State, this population shortage was rectified by a Statewide programme of artificial reproduction, producing a generation of so-called 'Tube Children' raised by the Caldari State apparatus to enlarge the labour pools available to the megacorporations that ruled the State.

The Jovians (a non-playable race) were also descended from colonists. Unlike the other races of Eve Online, they maintained a relatively high-functioning technological society after the collapse of the EVE wormhole and did not need to spend millennia rediscovering ancient societal developments as the others did, and while the other four major races were still grounded, Jovian history saw two major periods of spacefaring imperialism. They expanded outward and eventually turned to genetic engineering in order to mold themselves into a species more suited for deep-space life and long-range interstellar exploration. Genetic experimentation and manipulation were not without their drawbacks, however: by the time period in which players enter the Eve Online universe, millennia of human genetic manipulation have rendered the Jovians barely recognizable as human; more critically, the Jovian manipulation of their genome has resulted in the eventually fatal "Jovian Disease", an inherited psychological disorder which, despite the best efforts of the Jovians to reverse it, has affected every individual of the Jovian race and thus crippled their civilization. Having experienced a catastrophic population decline (the Jovian societal structure is believed to be barely maintained by their immensely-advanced technological systems), the Jovians have effectively retreated to inhabit a region of space inaccessible to outsiders.

In addition to different backgrounds and histories, the races have characteristic philosophies of starship design. Minmatar ships tend to be quite fast but fragile, and rely on their high speed and maneuverability to evade the tracking systems of heavier weapons, while using combinations of missile launchers and projectile weapons (such as artillery or autocannons – the more sophisticated kin of today's munitions technology) to output high amounts of damage. Amarr ships are ponderous, densely armored, and pack batteries of powerful laser-based energy weapons and energy neutralizers, which drain the power of enemy ships. Gallente ships are sleek and designed to favor armor plating; they specialize in deploying fleets of robotic drones while mounting hybrid weapons that operate using superconducting magnets to accelerate mass toward targets at great speed (see railgun). Finally, Caldari ships are typically poorly armored and not particularly fast but utilize powerful energy shields, and make extensive use of torpedo and/or missile launchers and hybrid weapons, favoring engagement at extreme ranges. However, there are exceptions to these general rules in each race.

== Gameplay ==
Players start the game by either selecting a previously created character or by creating a new one. Each Eve Online account allows for up to three characters. When a player creates a new character, they start by choosing one of the four playable races – Amarr, Gallente, Minmatar, or Caldari. Each race is further divided into three bloodlines that give characters different pre-defined appearances, which can be finely tuned by the player.

Unlike many other MMOs, where there are numerous copies of the game universe intended to run at once (i.e., servers), Eve Online is functionally a single-universe game. There are at least four copies of the universe running: the main server "Tranquility", the Chinese-based "Serenity", the test server "Singularity" (also "Sisi") which is a general, public test server, and an event server, "Thunderdome", which is used for tournaments. A new test server was announced called "Buckingham" to replace "Singularity" as the main EVE Online test server while "Singularity" was used for Dust 514/EVE Online joint testing. As Dust 514 is no longer active, "Singularity" is now the main test server again and "Buckingham" is a closed test server for the CCP developers.

=== Universe ===
The playing environment in Eve Online consists of more than 5,000 star systems, as well as 2,500 randomly accessible wormhole systems, taking place in the year 23,341. Systems are classified by their Security Status, on a decimal scale from −1.0 to 1.0. These systems are categorized into three groups, each determining the response from CONCORD (Consolidated Co-operation and Relations Command) NPC law enforcement units. Star systems classed as 0.5–1.0 security are considered "high security" and any unauthorized/unprovoked attack by a character on another character anywhere in the system will result in the appearance of law enforcement. These units will attack and destroy the aggressor, and are designed to reinforce in such strength that they will always win an engagement. However, CONCORD is not preventive, but punitive, meaning there is a short window between beginning an attack and getting destroyed where a player (or group of) can destroy another player's ship. Systems classified as 0.1–0.4 are considered "low security", where CONCORD law enforcement units will not destroy aggressors, but do monitor unprovoked acts of aggression and have automated sentry guns in some locations. Unprovoked attacks will flag the aggressor as a free target for other players, and attacks within sight of sentry guns will cause them to fire on the aggressor. Systems classified 0.0 to −1.0 are called "zero space" or "null sec", and feature no law enforcement; individual systems, or groups of systems, may be controlled by player alliances, up to the creation of player-owned empires reaching across entire "regions" (an aggregate group of star systems). Wormhole systems are accessible only by wormholes that randomly appear and disappear, and are also lawless space, showing as −1.0. However, player-run corporations cannot claim sovereignty in wormhole systems. Star systems contain different types of celestial objects, making them more or less suitable for different kinds of operations. Typically, players find asteroid fields, planets, stations, stargates, and moons in a system. Many of the game's most profitable income sources are found in dangerous null or low security systems, giving players incentive to engage in high-risk, high-reward activities in which they must survive the possible harassment of other players who may also enter the system.

=== Combat and travel ===
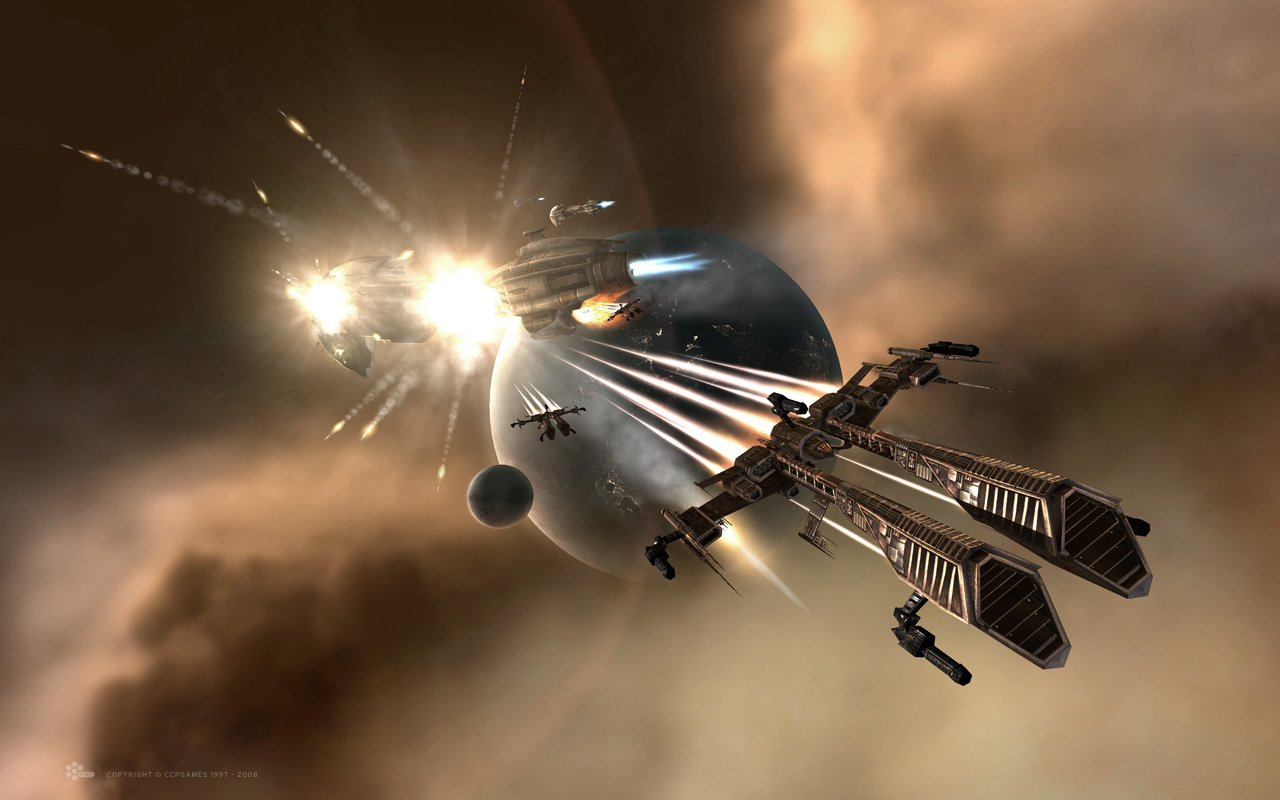
An artist's rendering of Rifter-class frigates after a successful attack against an Armageddon-class battleship

The game's primary mode of play is flying space ships. Players can dock at stations, where they are safe and can use station services such as repairing, refitting, and the regional market. All space combat takes place in real time at sub-light speeds from around 100 m/s to in excess of 8000 m/s, depending on ship size and setup. While players can manually control their ships as in space combat simulators such as Wing Commander or X-Wing following the release of the Rhea expansion on December 9, 2014, most opt instead to give commands such as Orbit, Approach or Align to their flight computer, which does its best to comply. Weapon aiming, however, cannot be done manually; instead, the player locks on to an opponent and orders their weapons to fire, and the result is determined through calculations based on factors such as range, velocity, weapon tracking, and a degree of randomness.

Travel across distances longer than hundreds of kilometers is mostly done with the ship's Warp Drive, which every ship and escape pod has. Alternatively a player may also choose to "slow boat" across these kind of distances, that is, traveling without warp drive. To warp, the player issues a command to warp to an object greater than 150 km away and in the same star system; after an alignment maneuver, their ship will enter warp. Warp speeds are measured in astronomical units per second (AU/s) and vary by ship class and fittings. A ship's warp drive can be temporarily disabled by warp disruption weapons, which is an essential part of combat to prevent a target from escaping.

For most ships, travel between star systems is only possible by using structures called "Stargates". Each stargate is linked to a partner stargate in another system; most star systems have more than two stargates, forming a network through which players travel. While players can travel to any number of destinations in individual systems, the need to use stargates to travel between systems makes them focal points for combat.

Besides using Stargates, capital ships can also utilize jump drives, which require another ship to create a "Cynosural Field" which the capital ship can then jump to. While this allows the capital ship to travel instantaneously, it requires a trusted second party (or an alternate account) to create the beacon. Jump drives also consume fuel (in contrast to stargates, which require nothing), drain the ship of its capacitor, leaving it nearly defenseless until it is recharged, and incur "jump fatigue", which prevents the pilot from jumping for progressively longer periods of time after each consecutive jump. Titans are also capable of allowing other ships to instantaneously travel by creating temporary bridges to cynosural fields. Black Ops battleships can create similar, but undetectable, bridges capable of transporting only specific types of stealth ships such as Stealth Bombers.

Player-run corporations that claim sovereignty over two null sec systems within range of each other can also set up a jump bridge at a player owned starbase (POS) that is in orbit of a moon. Jump bridges allow instantaneous travel to the other system's jump bridge, at the cost of using fuel (requiring supply by the owning corporation) scaled to the mass of ships that use them. This also leads to the accumulation of jump fatigue. As the aging POS systems & code have been phased out of the game, a deployable structure has effectively replaced the old jump bridge. However, unlike the old POS jump bridges, it allows players to customize who may use the gate based on settings such as standings or corporation / alliance affiliation. It also does not need to be deployed in a POS, and as such is often deployed near player owned Citadel structures.

=== Advancement ===
Unlike other massively multiplayer online games, player characters in Eve Online advance continuously over time by training skills, a passive process that occurs in real world time so that the learning process continues even if the player is not logged in. The skill training queue allows up to 50 skills to be scheduled, with up to a 10-year total training schedule. Before the November 4, 2014 "Phoebe" release, the skill training queue allowed skills to be scheduled to start training only up to 24 hours in the future. Some skills require other prerequisite skills to be trained to a certain level to be trained, and some skills require more time to train than others; for example, the skill to fly a Titan-class spaceship takes 8 times as long to train as the skill to fly a frigate ship, with a significant number of prerequisite skills.

Until the Odyssey expansion, it was not possible to train more than one character per account at the same time. Odyssey introduced "Dual Character Training", which allows players to expend PLEX (see accounts and subscriptions) in order to allow that account to train a second character for 30 days, equivalent to paying for a 30-day subscription on another account to train a single character. Odyssey 1.2 introduced the more generalized "Multiple Character Training" which allows players to expend more PLEX to activate this feature for a third character on the account.

=== Economy ===
The in-game economy in Eve Online is an open economy that is largely player-driven. Non-player character (NPC) merchants sell skill books used by players to learn new skills and blueprints to manufacture ships and modules. NPC merchants also buy and sell Trade Goods. Some Trade Goods are only for trade between NPC merchants while others have a functional use and are not good for trade with NPCs. The characters themselves gather the necessary raw materials to manufacture almost all of the ships and ship modules in the game. NPC ships can be looted and salvaged for items and materials. Non-player created ships and equipment may be purchased from various NPC factions as a character gains status with them, and can be resold in the in-game economy. The in-game currency is ISK (Interstellar Kredits), which is also the currency code of the Icelandic króna, the real-world currency of Iceland, where the Eve Online development studio is located.

The amount of money or materials in the universe is not fixed and, as such, the economy operates under supply and demand. Market manipulation is possible on a large scale, particular examples being ramping and bear raids. CCP does not issue refunds on in-game purchases. Hence, there is always the risk of certain types of confidence tricks or other scams. The economy is balanced by the automatic introduction of extra materials in underpopulated areas. This encourages a more even spread of players.

The game provides support for the trading of in-game resources, including graphs of item price history, with Donchian Channel and daily average price. Some player characters operate primarily as traders, generating profits through buying, selling, and transporting goods. Others operate primarily as producers, obtaining components or raw materials and transforming them, sometimes on massive scales, into useful items such as weapons, ships, ammunition, items, or various technologies in demand by other players. Some less combat-oriented players operate as miners or salvagers, collecting and processing ores used in manufacturing or collecting salvage materials to make into items, respectively. Finally, some characters operate as mercenaries or pirates, being paid primarily to be battle-ready and either to attack or defend other profitable enterprises.

Unlike some games such as Second Life, in-game currency is not freely convertible with real world currency. Players may only buy specific in-game items (such as Pilot License Extension (PLEX) tokens, 500 being redeemable for 30 days of Omega time) from CCP with real-world currency. The player can then sell the items on the in-game market for ISK (game currency). The reverse process, selling in-game currency or items for real-world money, is prohibited.

Commentators have attempted to estimate the value of Eve Online entities in real-world currency based on the current value of PLEX. One such conversion valued a fleet-ready titan (the most powerful ship in the game) at US$7,600, though estimates vary. Generally, no player expends such amounts of real-world currency to acquire such sums of in-game wealth, opting instead to do activities in-game that net high amounts of profit.

In 2007, CCP was the first game developer to hire an economist, Eyjólfur Guðmundsson, to oversee Eve's in-game economy. Guðmundsson was previously dean of the faculty of business and science at the University of Akureyri. Eyjólfur Guðmundsson left CCP in 2014 to the position of Rector at the University of Akureyri in July 2014.

=== Griefing ===
Owing to the game's focus on freedom, consequence, and autonomy, many behaviours that are considered griefing in most MMOs are allowed in Eve. This includes stealing from other players, extortion, and causing other players to be killed by large groups of NPCs.

Only malicious, prolonged and concentrated harassment where no material gain is involved and a few other actions are considered to be illicit griefing by the game's developers. Escaping retribution by CONCORD, the NPC space police force that punishes criminal activity in higher security solar systems, for criminal actions is also forbidden, as CONCORD is intentionally designed by game mechanics to be unstoppable.

== Ships ==
Ships in Eve Online are organized into classes, from tiny frigates only a few dozen meters in length to gigantic capital ships up to 17 kilometers long. Ships fill different roles and vary in size, speed, hull strength, and firepower; smaller ships are generally faster and capable of disabling their targets, but lack the damage output necessary to destroy larger ships, while capital ships do very high amounts of damage but have difficulty striking smaller, mobile targets. Each of the four races has its own unique ship design preferences and strengths and weaknesses, although all races have ships that are meant for the same basic roles and are balanced for play against each other. This means that there is no "best ship" in Eve Online.

=== Classes ===
Ships in Eve Online come in four size classes:

- Small starships include:
  - Shuttles – cheap, fast ships used for travel between systems, including null sec bubbles, and moving between ships. They have minimal cargo space and cannot fit modules
  - Corvettes – free, basic starter ships with minimal combat and mining capabilities, mainly useful for new pilots and short-distance travel
  - Frigates – small, mobile ships good for disruption and harassment
  - Destroyers – slightly larger and more offense-oriented than frigates
- Medium starships include:
  - Haulers – industrial ships designed to transport cargo, ranging from fast, agile transports for valuable goods to high-capacity and specialized transports for bulk or specific items
  - Cruisers – multipurpose ships with many possible roles
  - Battlecruisers – heavier, more combat-oriented cruisers
- The large class is made up of
  - Battleships – heavily armed and armored dedicated combat ships
- Extra-large, or capital class, starships include:
  - Freighters – massive cargo ships designed to transport huge volumes of goods across high-security space, with specialized variants for carrying assembled ships or planetary industry products
  - Carriers – offense-oriented ships that can launch wings of fighters to attack targets at extreme range
  - Dreadnoughts – dedicated siege ships for attacking structures and other capitals
  - Force auxiliary ships – dedicated support ships exceptional at repairing other ships
  - Supercarriers – larger versions of carriers, focused more on damage to capital class ships and powerful fleet disruption capabilities
  - Titans – supermassive mobile battle stations, capable of equipping doomsday devices which do massive amounts of damage to other capital ships, or have other powerful battle-affecting capabilities

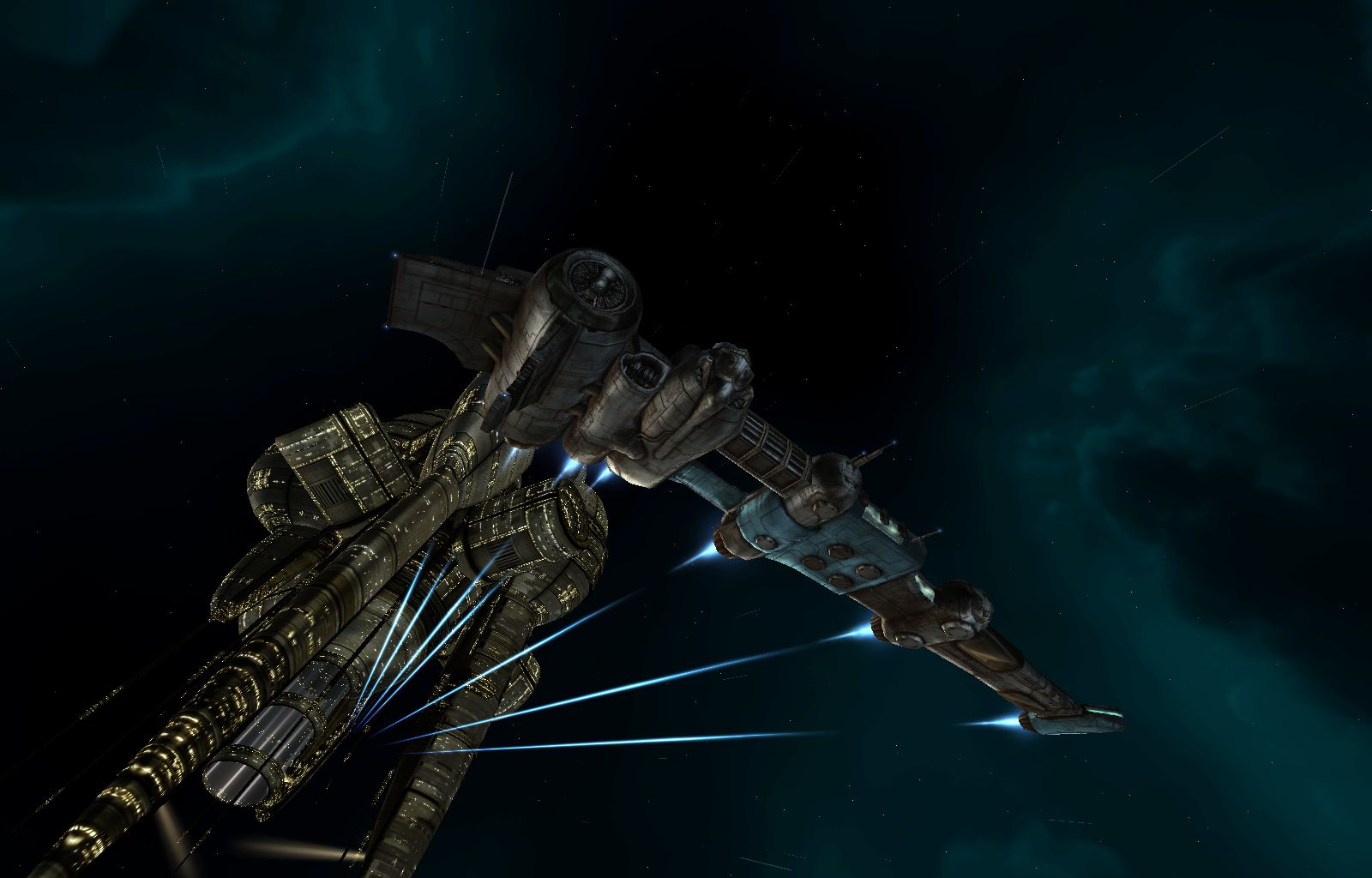
A Catalyst-class destroyer leaving a station

=== Characteristics ===
Each spaceship within the Eve Online universe has a different set of characteristics, and can be fitted with different combinations of modules, subject to their fitting requirements. Ships have a wide variety of characteristics, including power grid, CPU, capacitor size and recharge rate, energy shields, armor, maximum velocity, agility, locking range, and maximum number of lockable targets. A ship's systems also receive bonuses depending on the ship's pilot's levels of various skills. These bonuses usually correspond to the role the ship has been designed for, and thus vary widely. For instance, the Caldari "Caracal" cruiser has a bonus to the rate of fire of certain missile launcher types, while the Gallente "Vexor" cruiser has a bonus to the damage and hitpoints of certain types of combat drones.

One important characteristic of a ship is the slots it has available for modules. Slots and modules come in three variants—high-, mid-, and low-power.

Ships of different sizes have different numbers and ratios of module slots.

A ship may also have two to three slots for rigs, which are modules that require no power grid or CPU, but instead require a ship resource called calibration. Installing a rig is a semi-permanent action, as a rig cannot be removed from the ship without being destroyed. Rigs come in four sizes, small, medium, large, and capital, which roughly correspond to the size of the ship, and are used to affect other aspects of the ship such as maximum speed or cargo capacity, or to augment the capabilities of other modules installed in the ship. Most rigs also incur a penalty to a certain aspect of the ship; for example, armor rigs reduce the maximum velocity of the ship.

=== Tech level ===
All ships in the game are also classed according to Tech level, from Tech I to Tech III.

- Tech I (or T1) ships are general purpose, easily manufactured models that perform simple, straightforward functions in an obvious way; faction ships, which are usually very expensive and very proficient at their intended tasks, are also T1.
- Tech II (T2) ships are based on T1 designs, but have been modified to perform specific roles using specialized technology. T2 ships are harder to manufacture and are only produced by certain corporations, and are priced well above the T1 variants. They also require significantly greater skills to fly than their T1 variants.
- Tech III (T3) strategic cruisers were introduced into Eve Online in the Apocrypha patch. These highly advanced starships are manufactured from material recovered from beyond wormholes, another new feature introduced by Apocrypha; this gives them unique qualities. Strategic cruisers are rare and expensive, and require manufacturers to have unique skillsets that allow the reverse engineering and integration of highly advanced technologies recovered from dead or dormant ancient civilizations. The T3 ships introduced by Apocrypha differ from other ships in that they are modular. Players start with a hull and then add four subsystems to it, the choice of which can dramatically change the ship's character, giving it a different layout of module slots, different preferred weapon systems, and abilities such as being able to fit covert cloaks or ignore some warp disruption effects. The Rhea, Aegis, Tiamat, and Carnyx patches introduced four new T3 tactical destroyers. While these lack the modular nature of their strategic cruiser big brothers, they can dynamically swap between three "modes", augmenting their offensive, defensive, or propulsion capabilities, respectively, as needed by the pilot, even in the midst of combat. This gives these tactical destroyers substantially superior offensive, defensive, or evasive capabilities than other lower-tech destroyers, though they can only utilize one of the three capabilities at a time.

== Players and communities ==
Players have several interaction options when playing Eve Online. Every activity is possible for solo players but larger and more complicated tasks become more feasible for groups, such as pirate clans or corporations.

=== Corporations and alliances ===
Players can organize themselves into corporations (similar to guilds or clans in other MMOs). Corporations are run by one chief executive officer (CEO) who controls the corporation's assets. The CEO assigns roles to corporation members such as director, accountant and personnel manager. Corporations may also band together to form alliances. Corporations and alliances come in different shapes and sizes. Some player groups write press releases about new business openings and send out IPO information to potential in-game venture capital investors. Alliances can control enough star systems that their territory can be plotted on the Eve Online game map.

Corporations take up numerous business models such as mining, manufacturing or "ratting" (hunting NPC pirates for their bounties and loot). Corporations can levy income taxes on their members, which skim off a percentage of every member's earnings. Many corporations offer a variety of benefits to their members, such as free or discounted ships, equipment, formal training, and organized corporate group operations.

Among the many activities that corporations can organize is piracy. Actions considered piracy generally involve breaking the in-game law, and can come in a variety of forms. Pirates may camp stargates waiting for other players to arrive, attack players operating in asteroid belts or hunt for players carrying out an NPC agent-assigned mission. Because these activities are considered to be "illegal" within the game mechanics, pirate characters often will have low security status and may even be branded as outlaws by CONCORD. Likewise, victims of overt piracy may retaliate without intervention from CONCORD, often via an expressed right to destroy the pirate ship (i.e., "kill right"). Although piracy activities are "illegal" within the game universe, they are not against the rules of the game, i.e., there will only be in-game retaliation and punishment for them.

Illegally attacking another player in secure space will result in a loss of security standing; CONCORD, the interstellar NPC police, will arrive shortly to destroy the aggressor's ship. There are, however, legal ways to attack other players in high-security space.

Whole corporations and whole alliances can officially declare war on (or "war-dec") other corporations or alliances for a weekly fee, permitting all members of the involved corporations or alliances to attack each other without loss of security status or the intervention of CONCORD. The weekly fee can be eliminated if the war declaration is reciprocated. War declarations will clearly flag a player's enemies, so that players can determine who can legally attack and be attacked.

=== Demographics ===
N.B.: Demographic data for this game has not been collected uniformly or regularly.

In March 2006, CCP made a deal with Optic Communications to start working on bringing Eve Online to the Chinese gaming audience. Closed alpha testing was held on a small cluster for some time, with about 3,000 players chosen from an initial pool of 50,000. The Chinese open beta test began on June 13, 2006, and proved to be very popular, gaining numbers comparable to Eve Online's main server cluster. In order to avoid the shock of quickly adding thousands of new players to the current server (Tranquility), CCP Games decided to launch Eve in China on its own server (Serenity). In 2011, CCP allowed its licensing agreement with CDC Games, which had acquired Optic in July 2007, to expire. CCP created a new partnership with TianCity to relaunch Serenity on December 11, 2012.

The code base between Serenity (serving China) and Tranquility (serving the rest of the world) is synchronized, so that feature development is distributed to both server clusters, although the game worlds are not connected. Eve Online fully supports Unicode and has a back-end system to enable localization of each and every aspect of the game's content and UI.

In October 2006, the average age of an Eve Online player was 27, and 95% of players were male. The average weekly playtime was 17 hours, or just under 2.5 hours per day. By May 6, 2009, Eve Online claimed to have more than 300,000 active subscriptions and 45,000 active trial accounts. The total active subscription count at end of 2010 was 357,000 accounts.

On July 7, 2011, CCP announced that it planned to partner with Nexon Co. Ltd. to bring a "fully localized game client and product services for CCP's award winning... EVE Online" to Japan in the fall. Localized services for Japanese players would enable them to access the game in their native language through the Tranquility server, which currently hosts over 350,000 subscribers from around the world in three languages: English, German and Russian.

On May 5, 2013, Eve Online claimed a new record for the maximum number of simultaneous pilots online with 65,303 concurrent accounts logged on to the same server at the same time. This record was set on the eve of Eve Online's 10 year anniversary, and topped the previous record of 63,170 set January 23, 2011. Eve Online typically experiences the highest number of users on Sundays and the peak player records have almost exclusively been broken on Sundays.

=== Player tournaments ===
During two weekends in July 2006, a live streaming video production called Eve TV covered the events of the 2nd Caldari Alliance Tournament. The tournament pitted three-man teams from the top alliances against each other. Eve TV provided live in-game footage of the battles along with expert commentary. Analysis of the teams and strategies, interviews with CCP staff and behind-the-scenes specials were also aired between battles. Eve TV was produced and hosted primarily by DJs from Eve-Radio (a player-run streaming radio station) with resources provided by CCP. A total of 95 matches were scheduled, with the Band of Brothers alliance emerging the winner.

The first two weekends in December 2006 saw the 3rd Alliance tournament. This was once again broadcast via live streaming video by Eve TV The tournament saw 40 Alliances pitting five-man teams against each other. Once again, the Band of Brothers alliance emerged as the winner. Of particular note in this tournament was the fielding of an Imperial Apocalypse by the Interstellar Alcohol Conglomerate. The ship was destroyed in the semi-finals of the tournament by the COW (Cult of War) team. A last-minute attempt to arrange an 8 billion ISK ransom for the ship fell through.

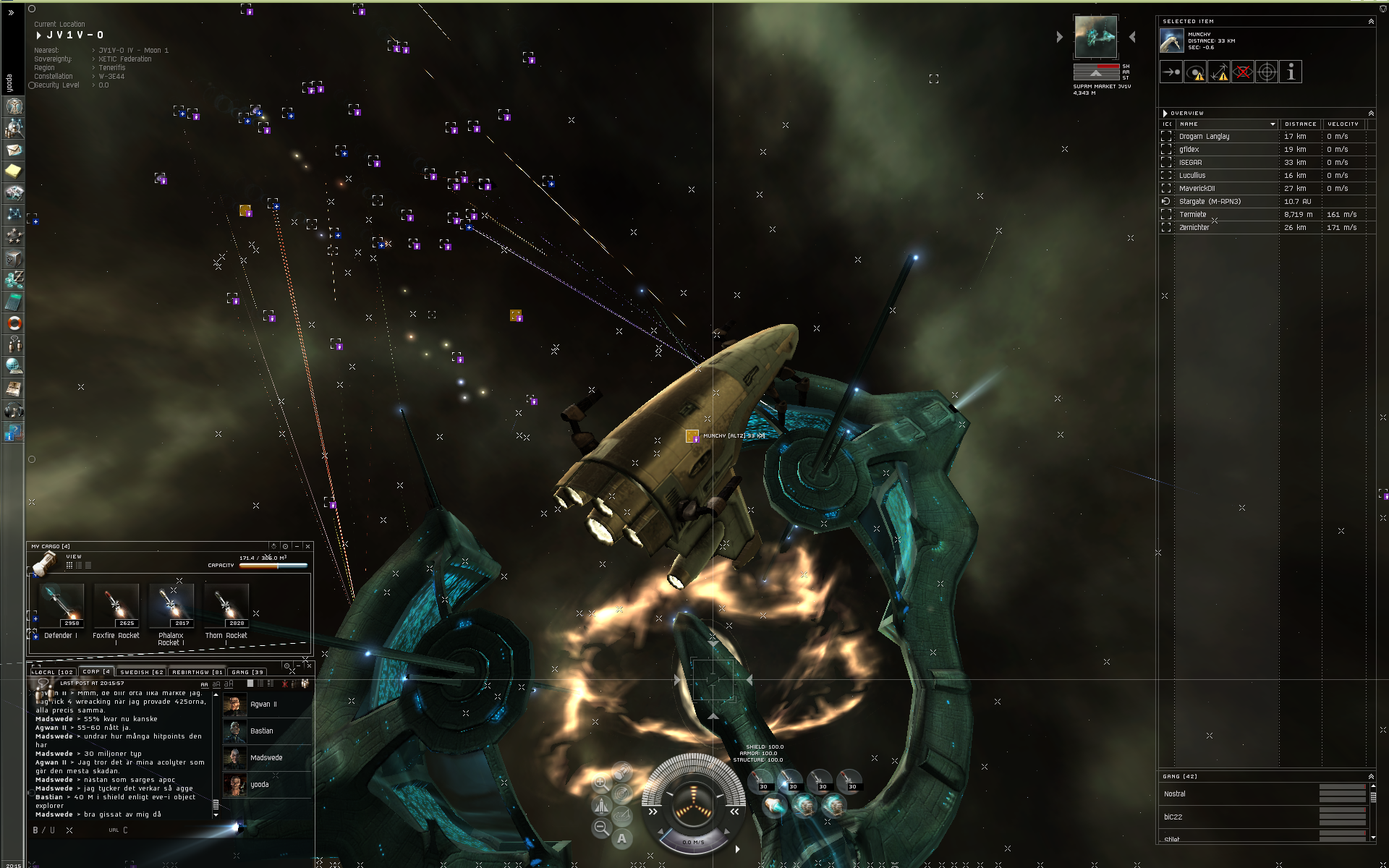
A battle in Eve Online between a number of players and a station

The fourth Alliance tournament in September 2007 brought several upsets, with Star Fraction defeating Band of Brothers in the second round, using only tech 1 cruisers, and Hun Reloaded sweeping both the semifinals and finals to win.

The two weekends starting February 29, 2008, and March 7, 2008, saw the fifth Alliance Tournament. Eve TV provided coverage via live streaming video. During the six days a total of 40 teams competed in 95 matches. The last tournament's winner, HUN Reloaded, made its way into the quarter-finals where it lost to Ev0ke alliance, who later became tournament champion after having won all eight of its matches.

The sixth Alliance Tournament was held during three consecutive weekends starting January 24, 2009, and ending on February 8, 2009. A total of 64 teams took part in the qualifying rounds on opening weekend. While the final weekend was broadcast live via Eve TV, the qualifying rounds were broadcast through various Eve Online radio channels. A number of changes were made to the tournament rules. This was also the first tournament Factional Militias were able to take part alongside traditional alliance teams. In the final match, R.U.R. went up against Pandemic Legion with Pandemic Legion emerging as the tournament winner.

Alliance Tournament 7 took place in September 2009, with Pandemic Legion winning a second successive tournament, beating Circle of Two in the final. Alliance Tournament 8 took place in June 2010, with Pandemic Legion winning for the third time, beating Hydra Reloaded, while Alliance Tournament 9 took place in June 2011, with Hydra Reloaded as the winner in the uncontested final match against Outbreak.

Alliance Tournament 10 took place over four consecutive weekends in July 2012. 64 Teams took part in the Tournament, with all matches being broadcast live on EVE TV. A number of changes were made to the format of matches, which included increasing the maximum number of pilots from 10 to 12. Verge of Collapse were eventually crowned Champions, defeating Alliance Tournament 4 winners HUN Reloaded in the final. The Alliance stunned everyone beating top teams to claim the title of Champions.

Alliance Tournament 11 took place over the course of three weekends in July and August 2013, with Pandemic Legion beating Exodus in the loser's bracket, then coming back from a 2–0 score in a best of five match against Hydra Reloaded to win 3 matches in a row and win their fourth Alliance Tournament, and their first victory since Alliance Tournament 8.

=== Volunteer program ===
The Interstellar Services Department (ISD) is a group of volunteers, made up of subscribed players, who assist in a variety of tasks like answering questions from players, bug hunting and QA testing, covering player-driven news, and writing game fiction. It includes ECAID (Equipment Certification and Anomaly Investigations Division), STAR (Support, Training and Resources), IC (Interstellar Correspondents), M (Mercury), CCL (Community Communication Liaisons), and YARR (Yulai Archives & Records Repository Team).

== Development ==
According to the developers, Eve Online evolved from the classic computer game Elite, which itself was based on concepts from the science-fiction role-playing game Traveller. Eve combined concepts from Elite with the multi player chat and player-versus-player aspects of Ultima Online. Elite had four single-player aspects: missions, mining, trade routes and combat with random hostile NPCs, all of which are aspects of the first incarnations of Eve Online.

One of the original developers of Elite, David Braben, believes Eve Online is a reimplementation of the 1980s game, not its true successor. Some of the developers (John Cameron, James Cassidy, Joe Chaney) also believe that this game creates a world where players can become someone else only possible in their imaginations.

Both the server and the client software for Eve Online are developed in Stackless Python, a variant of the Python programming language. Stackless Python allows a relatively large number of players to perform tasks without the overhead of using the call stack used in the standard Python distribution. This frees the game developers from performing some routine work and allows them to apply changes to the game universe without resetting the server. However, the Eve cluster is taken offline daily for database and server maintenance.

In July 2026, Fenris Creations announced that Carbon, their cross-platform game engine framework, is now open source.

=== Compatibility ===
On March 14, 2006, the Eve Online development team announced that they would be upgrading the graphics engine of Eve Online to a DirectX 10 / Windows Vista graphics platform. Revelations patch 1.4 had patch notes quoted as saying that the current Eve Online client should work in Vista "as well as it does in XP".

On September 10, 2007, CCP Games announced that the new Trinity 2 graphics engine will be using DirectX 9.0. This was released on December 5, 2007.

Official support for Linux and Mac platforms, using Transgaming Technologies Cedega and Cider (forks of Wine) for Linux and Mac compatibility, was introduced with the Revelations 2.3 patch released on November 6, 2007. At Fanfest 2008 Transgaming announced and demonstrated that the Premium graphics client is now running on Mac OS X 10.5 Leopard. In February 2009 CCP announced that they planned to discontinue the official Linux client with the next major patch, and advised on using third-party programs to run the Windows version of the client under Linux (namely Wine). The discontinuation of the official Linux client was primarily because the game ran better using the Windows client via Wine than it did with the official one, as a result many Linux users were already using Wine instead.

On December 4, 2020, CCP Games announced the development of a native Mac client, running on macOS Big Sur and using the Metal graphics framework; the initial release supporting Intel-based Macs was targeted for the first half of 2021, with a subsequent release to support M1-based Macs.

=== Third-party applications and the Eve API Project ===
Third-party applications supplement players' Eve Online experience. Some of these, such as automated applications designed to claim publicly available contracts accidentally put up without an associated cost, can result in a ban if discovered, while others are endorsed, tacitly or explicitly, by CCP. EVEMon, a .NET application that monitors and forecasts skill training times, is one example of an explicitly authorized external application. Another such application, Eve Fitting Tool or EFT, allows players to try different ship setups and see how certain skills and modules will affect that ship.

Third-party applications to monitor character information and skill training exist for both the Android and iPhone mobile platforms.

In May 2005, CCP announced the Eve API Project; third-party utilities such as EVEMon now interface with character data, market, and other data through an API.

=== Major content patches ===
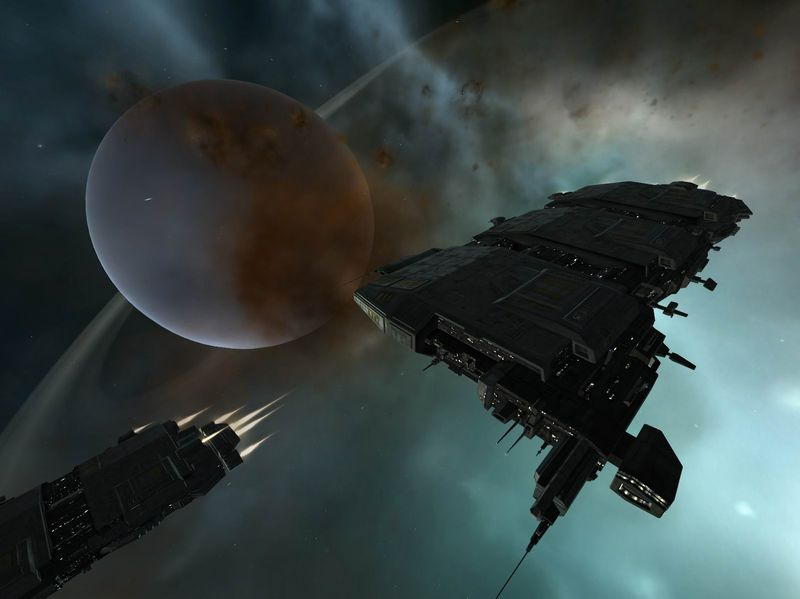
Two freight haulers called "Charons", a kind of ship introduced in the "Red Moon Rising" content patch

Since the initial release of Eve Online, CCP has added twenty-one expansions to the game, free of additional charge to its subscribers. The twentieth expansion "Rubicon", was released on November 19, 2013, and focused on new faction ships, introduction of mobile structures, and the first steps towards "The Future of EVE" outlined by CCP Seagull. The nineteenth expansion, "Odyssey", was released on June 4, 2013, and focused on exploration and rebalancing battleships. The eighteenth expansion, "Retribution", focused on a newly re-worked Crimewatch system. It also introduced the newly rebalanced frigates, destroyers, cruisers, and battlecruisers. The seventeenth expansion, "Inferno", added enhanced graphics for missile systems, a host of new ship modules, and a controversial new "Unified Inventory" UI. The sixteenth expansion, "Crucible", was released in November 2011 and shifted the focus from cosmetic changes to game mechanics. The fifteenth expansion, "Incarna", was released in the first stage of CCP's controversial Ambulation project, also known as the "Walking in Stations" project. "Incarna" added "Captain's Quarters" to stations, the first phase of allowing players to explore stations as human avatars, as well as an update to ship turret models. The fourteenth expansion, "Incursion", was released in stages, the second of which introduced the Sansha Incursions, in which Sansha's Nation invaded constellations, disrupting all forms of activity in the area, but provided large rewards for fighting back the incursions, and an overhaul of the character creation tool, paving the way for the Incarna expansion.

The eleventh expansion of Eve Online, "Apocrypha", was released on March 10, 2009, and introduced features such as further graphics updates as started in the Trinity expansion; the ability for players to group their vessels' weapons for easier interaction; changes to autopilot routes and avoidance of player-defined star systems. The twelfth expansion, "Dominion", was released on December 1, 2009, and overhauled the sovereignty system, while the thirteenth expansion, "Tyrannis", released on May 26, 2010, added planetary interaction as well as the online platform "EVE Gate".

Over time, expansions have added features such as conquerable and constructible space stations, massive capital ships, advanced versions of existing ships, or Epic Arcs for players to master. Apocrypha included an overhauled probing system, wormholes, a smarter and tougher AI and customizable Tech 3 ships as its major features. Dominion, which became available for download on December 1, 2009, included an overhaul of the sovereignty system, more realistic astronomy, the Titan Doomsday weapon functionality being changed and the in-game web browser with Chromium's WebKit. It also included a redesign of the UI and in-game mailing system. Tyrannis added new features, such as the ability to exploit planetary resources, a social networking program called EVE Gate, new technology for ships, and graphical updates.

==== Rapid release cycle ====
On May 6, 2014, at their yearly Fanfest convention, CCP announced the move from the current development cycle of two expansions per year, to ten feature-releases per year on a rapid release cycle. Senior Producer of EVE Online Andie Nordgren (CCP Seagull) stated that the move was necessary for future developments to have a more flexible release cycle, rather than the deadline imposed on the previous system, allowing smaller patches and changes to be deployed more rapidly and large projects not having to be rushed due to the expansion deadline.

However, in September 2015, Nordgren announced that CCP, while continuing with a five-week release cycle, would return to intermittently releasing large scale expansions for EVE. She described the new release cycle as a "hybrid form", where expansions would be "a set of big, connected features" with no fixed number per year, while the feature-releases would continue to bring "quality of life changes, ship balance changes, visual upgrades" and other smaller additions. The first new expansion, which was announced at EVE Vegas 2015, introduced a new modular starbase called a Citadel, and an overhaul of capital-class ships.

=== Planned future developments ===
The developers have been working on a game feature to allow players to exit pods and interact with other player avatars in the communal setting of a station interior. The first iteration, called Captain's Quarters, was released on June 21, 2011. The second iteration, with stylized quarters for each race, was released with the Crucible expansion. Player interaction in station environments has not yet been announced and only preliminary details have emerged.

The ability to enter a planet's atmosphere and to interact with its surface is mentioned as one of the future development plans. The "Future Vision" trailer portrays Dreadnaught-class ships performing planetary orbital bombardments on Dust battlefields. The first glimpse trailer of Dust 514 ended with a ship exploding in the atmosphere. However, the interaction between Dust and Eve has not been fully defined and no official confirmation has yet been provided. At Eve Fanfest 2005, a working prototype was demonstrated in which a Caldari Crow interceptor could be seen navigating a makeshift landscape superimposed on a nebula. However, this effort was later abandoned. CCP has stated that full-scale integration of such features requires an enormous effort and is only planned for post-Revelations (expansion) production phases, 2006. Subsequently, it was stated that, until a proven in-game reason is found for planetary access, further work on this feature will not have a high priority.

==== Dust 514 ====
During the 2009 Games Convention in Cologne, Germany, CCP unveiled Dust 514, a console-based MMOFPS title meant to integrate with the Eve Online universe. According to developers, players hired by Eve Online alliances would fight over planets.

According to Eve Online Creative Director Torfi Frans Ólafsson, at the 2009 Eve Online Fanfest, the Dominion release is planned to involve sovereignty, the ownership of districts on planets that are capable of creating industry. This player ownership system will be dynamic as it will be subject to PvP diplomacy as well as subjugation. The latter allows for linking with Dust 514, whereby players within Eve Online will be able to contract, in-game, Dust 514 players to take control of planetary regions within the Eve Online universe and these 'mercenaries' will then vie with other Dust 514 players hired by the opposing faction. The integration between the console MMOFPS game and the Eve Online MMORPG is both through community interaction and through the changeable battlefields based on the planetary architecture of a common universe – the outcome of these battles in Dust 514 will affect the status and ownership of the corresponding planets in Eve Online as well. At E3 2011, it was announced that Dust 514 is a PlayStation 3 exclusive with a PS Vita tie-in, both to be released in early 2012.

=== Decompiled source code ===
On May 20, 2011, decompiled EVE Online source code was published by an unknown person on a GitHub repository. After being online for four days, CCP issued a DMCA take-down request which was granted by GitHub.

== Music ==
EVE Online: Original Soundtrack, Vol. 1

Soundtrack album by Real-X (Jón Hallur Haraldsson)
- Released: August 12, 2009
- Genre: Video game soundtrack
- Length: 74:28

The Eve Online soundtrack was composed by Jón Hallur Haraldsson, also known as Real-X. Icelandic rap-rock group Quarashi also composed several tracks for the game. A digital soundtrack titled EVE Online: Original Soundtrack, Vol. 1 was released on iTunes on August 12, 2009. The soundtrack comes with an audio book track EVE Chronicle – Taught Thoughts. The soundtrack has since been removed from iTunes.

The game itself contains an extensive in-game soundtrack. On December 4, 2012, the "Retribution" expansion of Eve Online was released. Among its features was the removal of the Jukebox, which enabled players to select their favorite songs to play. In tandem with this, CCP Games announced that the entire game soundtrack (consisting of music in the game at the time) would be available to download for free from SoundCloud. The soundtrack consists of 74 songs, with a running time of nearly seven hours.

== Public perception ==
=== Virtual crime ===
Piracy (in the ship-to-ship sense) is part of the game, as are protection racketeering, theft, and ransom. Eve Online periodically has arisen for discussion within the wider gaming community as players of the game find various ingenious methods of scamming, deceiving, or attacking each other. One infamous example was a corporate infiltration and heist where one corporation infiltrated a target corporation over the course of nearly a year. They then performed a virtual assassination on the target's CEO and proceeded to steal corporate property to which they had gained access. The target corporation lost billions of ISK worth of property (amounting to about US$16,500) and a great deal of prestige; the CEO's expensive ship and cybernetic implants were destroyed in the attack. Events of this nature are debated both inside the game world and in the media.

In 2009, a player alliance known as Goonswarm was contacted by a disgruntled director of rival alliance Band of Brothers, one of the largest alliances in the game at that time. The defecting director then stripped Band of Brothers of a large quantity of assets including ships, money and territory, and disbanded the alliance.

A player-run bank known as 'EBank' was also involved in controversy in 2009 when Ricdic, the CEO of the bank, withdrew 200 billion ISK and converted it into real world currency worth about A$6,100 (US$4,590) to make a down payment on a home and pay for medical expenses.

Such dangers are an inherent part of Eve Online's virtual economy and thus are purposely not dealt with by the developers. Players are expected to make financial decisions based (among other factors) on the possibility of other players' fiduciary malfeasance, much as in real-life economics.

The most common acts of piracy in Eve are ganking, gate camping, and small gang warfare. Every pirate corporation in Eve Online has its own preferred activities, strategies, and tactics. Some utilize cheap but high damage ships to "suicide gank" and kill players in high-security space (where they should theoretically be safe) quickly before CONCORD law enforcement units arrive to destroy them (thus "suiciding"), in the knowledge that certain ships they destroy will be carrying valuable commodities or expensive gear capable of recovering the cost of the pirate vessels lost in the gank. Others choose to set up gate camping fleets consisting of varied ship types and roles capable of rapidly disabling and destroying any unwitting passersby, thereby locking down star systems and killing or robbing whoever tries to pass through. Other pirates choose to roam in very fast and versatile skirmish ships, such as interceptors, recons, or heavy assault ships, killing anyone they encounter in lightning attacks. On gaining the upper hand in a fight many pirates will ask the victim for an ISK ransom, in exchange for sparing their ship or escape pod.

Suicide ganking has declined in overall popularity since the release of the Crucible expansion; while players may opt to insure their ships against loss using in-game currency, pilots will no longer be reimbursed if their ship is destroyed by CONCORD. Such changes have been the subject of intense debate on the game's official forums, with opinions divided on whether or not players should be truly 'safe' while flying.

=== Developer misconduct ===
Instances of developer misconduct in Eve Online have been substantiated, leading to debates and controversy. On February 9, 2007, a player known as Kugutsumen hacked an enemy corporation's private forum to find out and reveal that Eve Online developer t20 had provided his corporation, Reikoku, with six valuable blueprints, giving them an advantage over competing corporations. Some within the Eve Online community asked for t20's dismissal. While an apology letter was left for the community in the form of a dev blog, he remained an Eve Online developer until late 2008. Kugutsumen was permanently banned from the Eve Online universe for violating the game's terms of service and end-user license agreement by revealing t20's real name.

In response to public concerns, CCP decided to set up an internal affairs division whose responsibility is to monitor the activities of both privileged and player accounts operated by CCP staff in-game.

=== Council of Stellar Management ===
In part due to the matters above, CCP invited users to stand for the first Council of Stellar Management (CSM) in March 2008, resulting in 66 candidates seeking election to nine positions. It was a requirement that candidates release their full real names in addition to stating their in-game details. In May, after a two-week voting period, the first Council was elected, comprising seven men and two women; three each from the Netherlands and the United Kingdom, two from the US and one from Denmark, their ages ranging from 17 to 52.

The remit of the council has been changed since it was first proposed and is now seen by CCP primarily as a route for players to make requests for changes and improvements to the game mechanics, presentation, and game content of Eve Online. The first four Councils served for six months, after which new ones were to be elected. Each individual was only permitted to serve twice. Each CSM gets the authority to put requests to CCP three times during their term of office which CCP have stated must be answered; once in person in Iceland and twice by e-mail, with most of the costs of their visit to Iceland being borne by CCP. The rules were changed for the fifth CSM to feature one-year terms with two Iceland trips and four email requests, as well as the abolition of the two-term limit.

The first meeting of the CSM with CCP took place in Reykjavik between June 19 and 23, 2008, and included not only the nine CSM members but a number of developers, designers, game masters, and producers from CCP and members of print and video media. Matters discussed by players on the Eve Online forums were reviewed in detail and whilst some were rejected for technical reasons, many were accepted by CCP as useful improvements to the game which would be introduced either in an early so-called point release or added to the development plans for a future major update.

Nominations for the second CSM opened on September 26, 2008, with voting commencing on November 9. The following third Council of Stellar Management included a modified age restriction: candidates under the age of 21 are then no longer eligible as CSM members.

Beginning with the eighth CSM, a single transferable vote system was introduced, allowing voters to select up to 14 candidates.

== Accounts and subscriptions ==
Users start playing Eve Online by creating a free account (known as an Alpha account), being invited to the game as via the game's Recruit-A-Friend program, or purchasing the Eve Online Special Edition retail box. Alpha accounts are freely available through both the Eve Online website and the Steam content delivery system. The accounts through the Recruit-A-Friend program function identically to normal Alpha accounts, but start with some additional unallocated skill points (worth approximately 5–6 days worth of training time) on their first character.

Alpha accounts are free and allow players to access most of the Eve Online game, with exceptions.

As of June 2008, Eve Time Codes (or ETCs) are available exclusively in 60-day increments. Before then, they were also offered in 30-, 50-, 90-, 100- and 120-day increments. Discontinued cards remain valid. Players using ETCs are treated like normal subscribers in every way. Eve Time Codes are available through CCP's online store as well as via online resellers. Cards purchased through resellers are usually delivered through email for immediate use while codes issued through the Eve Online store are issued via postal mail or in-game item, and as such ETCs do not violate the EULA and can be bought and sold within the game. There are no distinguishing differences in functionality between digital and hard-copy codes. Both provide the exact amount of specified game time, are entered into the same account section and can be exchanged between players for ISK using a secure exchange system facilitated by a "Timecode Bazaar" forum.

In November 2008, CCP introduced PLEX, the CONCORD Pilots License EXtension, which is an in-game item that can be used to extend a subscription for 30 days. PLEX can be purchased on the Eve Online website for real money, or inside the game for ISK. 60-day ETCs can be converted to two 30-day PLEX within the Eve Online client, which can then be sold via the in-game market. PLEX is the reason that the cost of in-game assets can be translated into real-life money. As the price of a PLEX is around €15, it can be calculated how much a certain ship or implant is theoretically worth in a real currency.

In May 2017, CCP converted PLEX into smaller increments. All existing PLEX were converted to 500 of the new PLEX (which are exclusively referred to as PLEX in-game, rather than Pilot License EXtension, though the acronym meaning remains unchanged). 30 days subscriptions now cost 500 PLEX, effectively the same cost as previously. The previous premium currency, Aurum, was retired and converted to PLEX at the same exchange rate as PLEX could be exchanged for Aurum previously (1 old PLEX per 3500 Aurum, so 1 new PLEX per 7 Aurum), provided the account had at least 1000 Aurum to convert. All items in the premium store that used to cost Aurum now cost an equivalent number of PLEX. This allowed CCP to market more granular deals on PLEX, as well as price certain services for PLEX with more granularity. For example, Multiple Character Training used to cost 1 PLEX, the same prices as 30 days of subscription time, but now costs 450 PLEX, 90% of the cost of 30 days of subscription time. In the same patch, CCP also introduced the PLEX Vault, a safe and secure way of moving PLEX around in-game without risking the item being lost if one's ship were destroyed.

As of March 10, 2009, a boxed edition is available in shops. The distribution is being managed by Atari. The boxed edition includes a 60-day ETC, instant standings update to facilitate quicker entry into factional warfare, exclusive online new player guide, and an exclusive expanded cargo hold shuttle. Although marketed as included in the retail box, the bonus items are only available to new accounts created with the 60-day ETC.

=== Subscribers ===
Note: As of 2014, CCP no longer releases active subscription counts to the public.

View source data.

Eve Online active subscribers worldwide
Year	Subscribers (in thousands)
2003	25
2004	50
2005	75
2006	100
2007	150
2008	200
2009	300
2010	357
2011	351
2012	400
2013	500
2014	485

== Reception ==
Reception

Aggregate scores
Aggregator	Score
GameRankings	75% (Exodus) 90%
Metacritic	69/100 (Special Edition) 88/100 (Commissioned Officer Edition) 77/100

Review scores
Publication	Score
Edge	8/10
GameRevolution	B+
GameSpot	8/10
GameSpy	3/5
GameZone	8.8/10
IGN	8/10
PC Magazine	4/5

Awards
Publication	Award
	MMORPG.com Best Over All Game 2007
	Best MMO of 2008 Beckett Massive Online Gamer
	MMORPG.com Game of the Year 2009
	MMORPG.com Game of the Year 2010
	MMORPG.com Game of the Year 2011

Eve Online received mixed reviews at the launch of the game in 2003 but more favorable reviews later in its lifecycle. The original version received 75% on GameRankings and 69/100 on Metacritic. The Special Edition released in 2009 has an aggregate score of 88/100 on Metacritic.

In 2004, the Academy of Interactive Arts & Sciences nominated the expansion Eve Online: Second Genesis for "Massively Multiplayer/Persistent World Game of the Year" at the 7th Annual Interactive Achievement Awards. Then for three consecutive years, the academy also nominated the following expansions for "Massively Multiplayer Game of the Year": Revelations in 2007, Trinity in 2008, and Quantum Rise in 2009.

In 2013, PC Gamer placed Eve Online at #12 on their list of 100 Greatest Games of All Time.

In June 2013, the Museum of Modern Art added Eve Online to its permanent collection of video games. The game is showcased as a "day in the universe" video. To create this, CCP Games called upon Eve Online's large player-base to provide gameplay footage of the game. Furthermore, CCP Games contributed a large amount of data from its servers, which were compiled to produce a "stunning view" of the accomplishments of player collaborations.

=== Awards ===
- PC Gamer Sweden: Best Online RPG 2003
- SuperPlay GULDPIXELN 2003: Online Game of the year
- 2003 Gamespy Best Graphics
- 2005 MMORPG.com Best Graphics, Best PvP, Favorite Company, and Reader's Choice Best Game
- 2006 MMORPG.com Favorite Graphics, Favorite PvE, Favorite PvP, Favorite Story, and Favorite Game
- 2007 MMORPG.com Best Overall Game of 2007
- 2009 MMORPG.com Game of the Year
- 2010 MMORPG.com Game of the Year
- 2011 MMORPG.com Game of the Year

== Other media ==
In 2013, CCP said that they had made deals to create both a comic book and a television series based on Eve Online. The comic, titled Eve: True Stories, was released by Dark Horse Comics and made available for free online in 2014. Following this, a physical version of the graphic novel containing bonus material was made available that same year. To make the television series, CCP signed a deal with Icelandic director Baltasar Kormákur. As of May 2013, no information has been given about the title or the premiere date of the television series. The storylines from both the graphic novel and the television series will be based on actual player-driven events that happened in the game. The board game EVE: Conquests was based on Eve Online.

=== Tie-in novels ===
- EVE: The Empyrean Age (2009) by Tony Gonzalez
- EVE: The Burning Life (2010) by Hjalti Daníelsson
- EVE: Templar One (2012) by Tony Gonzalez

== See also ==
- Elite Dangerous
- Star Citizen
- No Man's Sky
