= Generalized map =

In mathematics, a generalized map is a topological model which allows one to represent and to handle subdivided objects. This model was defined starting from combinatorial maps in order to represent non-orientable and open subdivisions, which is not possible with combinatorial maps. The main advantage of generalized map is the homogeneity of one-to-one mappings in any dimensions, which simplifies definitions and algorithms comparing to combinatorial maps. For this reason, generalized maps are sometimes used instead of combinatorial maps, even to represent orientable closed partitions.

Like combinatorial maps, generalized maps are used as efficient data structure in image representation and processing, in geometrical modeling, they are related to simplicial set and to combinatorial topology, and this is a boundary representation model (B-rep or BREP), i.e. it represents object by its boundaries.

== General definition ==
The definition of generalized map in any dimension is given in and:

A nD generalized map (or nG-map) is an (n + 2)-tuple G = (D, α_{0}, ..., α_{n}) such that:

- D is a finite set of darts;
- α_{0}, ..., α_{n} are involutions on D;
- α_{i} o α_{j} is an involution if i + 2 ≤ j (i, j ∈ { 0, ,..., n }).

An nD generalized map represents the subdivision of an open or closed orientable or not nD space.

== See also ==
- Boundary representation
- Combinatorial map
- Quad-edge data structure
- Rotation system
- Simplicial set
- Winged edge
