= Battle Command (video game) =

1990 video game

- Developer: Realtime Games
- Publisher: Ocean Software
- Platforms: Amstrad CPC, Atari ST, Commodore 64, Amiga, MS-DOS, ZX Spectrum
- Release: 1990
- Genre: Vehicle simulation
- Mode: Single-player

Battle Command is a futuristic 3D tank simulation game released by Ocean in 1990. It was written by Realtime Games and is a development of their successful title Carrier Command.

== Plot ==
In some unknown time in the future, armies of tanks battle for supremacy as the Ultra War rages between the two dominant races in the New World.

== Gameplay ==
The player takes control of a single "Mauler" assault tank in a series of combat missions against other armoured vehicles and stationary targets.

Unlike Carrier Command which incorporated significant strategic elements, Battle Command is a simple arcade game reminiscent of Battlezone.

The player views the battle from the forward perspective of the tank. As with Battlezone, the turret is fixed and cannot be rotated or elevated. However the playing area is flat and shells travel in long horizontal trajectories, so to aim the gun the tank is simply rotated left or right.

The player may equip their tank with a variety of weapons, the choice of which will depend on the nature of the mission. The Helicarrier will then drop the tank into the combat zone to carry out its objectives. On successful completion of the mission the Helicarrier will retrieve the Mauler and carry it to safety.

There are ten missions in all to complete.

== Reception ==
Reception

Award
Publication	Award
Crash	Crash Smash
