= Graph-encoded map =

Graph describing a topological embedding

A graph-encoded map (gray triangles and colored edges) of a graph in the plane (white circles and black edges)

In topological graph theory, a graph-encoded map or gem is a method of encoding a cellular embedding of a graph using a different graph with four vertices per edge of the original graph. It is the topological analogue of runcination, a geometric operation on polyhedra. Graph-encoded maps were formulated and named by Lins (1982). Alternative and equivalent systems for representing cellular embeddings include signed rotation systems and ribbon graphs.

The graph-encoded map for an embedded graph $G$ is another cubic graph $H$ together with a 3-edge-coloring of $H$. Each edge $e$ of $G$ is expanded into exactly four vertices in $H$, one for each choice of a side and endpoint of the edge. An edge in $H$ connects each such vertex to the vertex representing the opposite side and same endpoint of $e$; these edges are by convention colored red. Another edge in $H$ connects each vertex to the vertex representing the opposite endpoint and same side of $e$; these edges are by convention colored blue. An edge in $H$ of the third color, yellow, connects each vertex to the vertex representing another edge $e'$ that meets $e$ at the same side and endpoint.

An alternative description of $H$ is that it has a vertex for each flag of $G$ (a mutually incident triple of a vertex, edge, and face). If $(v,e,f)$ is a flag, then there is exactly one vertex $v'$, edge $e'$, and face $f'$ such that $(v',e,f)$, $(v,e',f)$, and $(v,e,f')$ are also flags. The three colors of edges in $H$ represent each of these three types of flags that differ by one of their three elements. However, interpreting a graph-encoded map in this way requires more care. When the same face appears on both sides of an edge, as can happen for instance for a planar embedding of a tree, the two sides give rise to different gem vertices. And when the same vertex appears at both endpoints of a self-loop, the two ends of the edge again give rise to different gem vertices. In this way, each triple $(v,e,f)$ may be associated with up to four different vertices of the gem.

Whenever a cubic graph $H$ can be 3-edge-colored so that the red-blue cycles of the coloring all have length four, the colored graph can be interpreted as a graph-encoded map, and represents an embedding of another graph $G$. To recover $G$ and its embedding, interpret each 2-colored cycle of $H$ as the face of an embedding of $H$ onto a surface, contract each red--yellow cycle into a single vertex of $G$, and replace each pair of parallel blue edges left by the contraction with a single edge of $G$.

The dual graph of a graph-encoded map may be obtained from the map by recoloring it so that the red edges of the gem become blue and the blue edges become red.
