= Wings 3D =

Software for 3D modeling and texturing

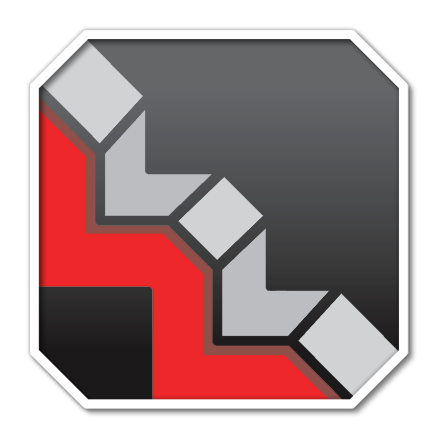

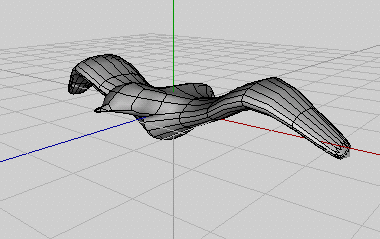
- Simple editing in Wings 3D
- Developers: Björn Gustavsson, Dan Gudmundsson, and others
- Initial release: 1 January 2001; 24 years ago
- Stable release: 2.4 / 10 November 2024; 11 months ago
- Repository: wings on GitHub
- Written in: Erlang
- Operating system: Cross-platform
- Type: 3D computer graphics
- License: BSD license
- Website: www.wings3d.com

Wings 3D is a free and open-source subdivision modeler inspired by Nendo and Mirai from Izware. Wings 3D is named after the winged-edge data structure it uses internally to store coordinate and adjacency data, and is commonly referred to by its users simply as Wings.

Wings 3D is available for Windows, Linux, and Mac OS X, using the Erlang environment.

== Overview ==
Wings 3D can be used to model and texture low to mid-range polygon models. Wings does not support animations and has only basic OpenGL rendering facilities, although it can export to external rendering software such as POV-Ray and YafRay. Wings is often used in combination with other software, whereby models made in Wings are exported to applications more specialized in rendering and animation such as Blender.

== Interface ==
Wings 3D uses context-sensitive menus as opposed to a highly graphical, icon-oriented interface. Modeling is done using the mouse and keyboard to select and modify different aspects of a model's geometry in four different selection modes: Vertex, Edge, Face and Body. Because of Wings's context-sensitive design, each selection mode has its own set of mesh tools. Many of these tools offer both basic and advanced uses, allowing users to specify vectors and points to change how a tool will affect their model. Wings also allows users to add textures and materials to models, and has built-in AutoUV mapping facilities.

== Features ==
- A wide variety of Selection and Modeling Tools
- Modeling Tool support for Magnets and Vector Operations
- Customizable Hotkeys and Interface
- Tweak Mode lets you make quick adjustments to a mesh
- Assign and edit Lighting, Materials, Textures, and Vertex Colours
- AutoUV Mapping
- Ngon mesh support
- A Plugin Manager for adding and removing plugins
- Import and Export in many popular formats

== Supported file formats ==
Wings loads and saves models in its own format (.wings), but also supports several standard 3D formats.

=== Import ===
- Nendo (.ndo)
- 3D Studio (.3ds)
- Adobe Illustrator (.ai)
- Lightwave/Modo (.lwo/.lxo)
- Wavefront (.obj)
- PostScript (Inkscape) (.ps)
- Encapsulated PostScript (.eps)
- Stereolithography (.stl)
- Paths (.svg)

=== Export ===
- Nendo (.ndo)
- 3D Studio (.3ds)
- Adobe Illustrator (.ai)
- BZFlag (.bzw)
- Kerkythea (.xml)
- Lightwave/Modo (.lwo/.lxo)
- Wavefront (.obj)
- POV-Ray (.pov)
- Cartoon Edges (.eps/.svg)
- Stereolithography (.stl)
- Renderware (.rwx)
- VRML 2.0 (.wrl)
- DirectX (.x)
- Collada (.dae)

== See also ==
- Blender (software)
- 3D modelling
