= 3D Tank Duel =

1984 video game

- Developer: Realtime Games Software
- Publishers: Realtime Games Software; Zeppelin Games
- Platform: ZX Spectrum
- Release: EU: 1984
- Genre: Action
- Mode: Single-player

3D Tank Duel is a video game developed by Realtime Games Software for the ZX Spectrum home computer. It is a clone of the arcade game Battlezone, featuring wireframe 3D graphics with colour.

The game was later re-released in 1989 as Battle Tank Simulator by Zeppelin Games.

== Gameplay ==
The player controls a tank in a first-person perspective, with the objective of shooting enemy tanks and randomly appearing UFOs while avoiding being hit. The game screen is split into two areas: the top section is black and displays the score, high score, and a radar screen, while the lower portion shows a yellow desert landscape.

The radar screen features a sweep arm and is used to track enemies. The game includes four types of enemy tanks, flying saucers, and missiles, each with varying artificial intelligence that requires different strategies to defeat. Upon destruction, enemy units explode into fragments.

Obstacles in the desert serve as barriers and impede progress if hit. The game simulates realistic tank movement, with keys controlling the left and right tracks separately. Enemy tanks and missiles exhibit complex movements, including dodging behind obstacles and missiles leaping over them.

3D Tank Duel expands upon the original Battle Zone concept by including more varied landscapes and additional features such as revolving radar dishes.

== Reception ==
Reception

Review scores
Publication	Score
Crash	83%, 55% (1989 re-release)
Computer and Video Games	32/40
Sinclair User	6/10, 65% (1989 re-release)
Your Sinclair	4/10
Popular Computing Weekly	2/5

The game received mixed reviews from critics. Many praised its graphics, sound, and smooth movement, with some recommending it over other Battlezone clones available for the ZX Spectrum, even the official port by Quicksilva. The realistic 3D effect and detailed graphics were particularly noted as strengths.

Some reviewers however found the graphics slightly confusing, with colours occasionally obscuring enemies. Opinions on the gameplay speed and collision detection were divided, with some critics finding it slow and disappointing.

Despite these criticisms, some reviewers found the game addictive and enjoyable. Others described the game as a good version of arcade original, but otherwise unremarkable.

== See also ==
Rommel's Revenge another Battlezone clone for the Spectrum, released in 1983
