= Mirai (software) =

3D computer graphics software

- Developer: Izware
- Written in: Common Lisp
- Operating system: Windows
- Type: 3D computer graphics
- License: Proprietary
- Website: www.izware.com/mirai

Mirai is a 3D creation and editing suite available originally from Nichimen Graphics Corporation, later from Winged Edge Technologies, and currently from Izware. The modeller uses the winged edge data structure, is written in Common Lisp, and traces its lineage to the S-Geometry software from Symbolics. It has been used primarily by game developers and high-end character animators—for example by Bay Raitt's facial morph targets for the Gollum character in The Lord of the Rings film trilogy.

== See also ==
- N-World graphics software
- Wings 3D graphics software
