= N-World =

3D computer graphics software

Nichimen N-World, Mirai, and Nendo

- Nichimen N-World 3.1 geometry editor
- Developers: Nichimen Graphics, Inc.
- Stable release: 3.2 / January 1999; 27 years ago
- Written in: Common Lisp
- Operating system: IRIX, Windows
- Type: 3D computer graphics
- License: Proprietary

N-World is a 3D graphics package developed by Nichimen Graphics in the 1990s, for Silicon Graphics and Windows NT workstations. Intended primarily for video game content creation, it has polygon modeling tools, 2D and 3D paint, scripting, color reduction, and exporters for several popular game consoles.

After its initial release on Windows NT, N-World was renamed Mirai. The winged edge 3D modeler in N-World inspired the development at Nichimen Graphics of Nendo, a standalone 3D modeler, which in turn inspired the open source modeler Wings 3D.

== History ==
N-World originated with Symbolics, a computer manufacturer notable for producing Lisp-based systems in the 1980s. Among the software packages that were produced for Symbolics computers are S-Graphics, a 3D animation suite that includes modules for polygon modeling, dynamics, paint, and rendering — titled S-Geometry, S-Dynamics, S-Paint, and S-Render, respectively. In 1992, Japanese trading company Nichimen Corporation purchased the rights to S-Graphics, ported it to Silicon Graphics IRIX, and marketed it as N-World.

N-World retains the Lisp-based underpinnings of its predecessor, but was targeted at interactive content producers, with features useful for game developers. It was priced at US$16,995 (equivalent to $34,100 in 2025) for the full suite, later reduced to $9,995 when ported to Windows NT in 1997.

N-World was used to create graphics for many console games in the 1990s, specifically most of the Nintendo 64 games, like Super Mario 64 and Final Fantasy VII. It was superseded by Mirai in 1999.

== Features ==
The N-World package, like its predecessor S-Graphics, is divided into several components:

- N-Geometry: 3D polygon-based modeling tools, including smoothing, "magnet" geometry editing, and instancing.
- N-Dynamics: Animation tools including scripting, curve-based animation, and skeletal animation.
- N-Render: Surfacing and rendering tools with ray tracing and materials output to various game console formats.
- N-Paint: 2D and 3D paint with mattes, effects, color reduction, and a visual VRAM editor for PlayStation.
- Game Tools: Utilities for game developers, including exporters for PlayStation, Nintendo 64, and Saturn consoles.

== Credits ==
The following games were created using N-World.

- Super Mario 64
- Final Fantasy VII
- Gran Turismo
- Bomberman 64
- Magic the Gathering
- NBA Jam Extreme
- NHL Breakaway
- PaRappa the Rapper
- MediEvil
- WWF '98
- Derby Stallion (PS1)
- Shin Kaitei Gunkan
- AeroGauge
- Virtual ProWrestling
- Power Ranger Pin Ball
- Spider
- Motor Toon Grand Prix
- Beast Wars: Transformers
- Overblood
- Enemy Zero
- Forsaken
- 64 Ōzumō
- Crash Bandicoot
- Rap Stars Online
