= Battlezone (2008 video game) =

- Developer(s): Stainless Games
- Publisher(s): Atari
- Composer(s): Cris Velasco
- Platform(s): Xbox 360 (XBLA)
- Release: April 16, 2008
- Genre(s): Shooter
- Mode(s): Single-player, Multiplayer

Battlezone is an arcade game released by Stainless Games in 2008. It is an update of Battlezone, the arcade classic vector graphics tank shooter. The game features an update of the game with new gameplay features, as well as a port of the original.

== Gameplay ==
The game features two modes, Evolved and Classic, both feature two difficulty settings Normal and Throttle Monkey.

=== Evolved ===
Evolved gameplay is an update of the original game. It features the core mechanics of the classic mode while adding Deathmatch, Team Deathmatch, and Capture the Flag multiplayer modes, 1080i graphics, Dolby 5.1 audio and support for Xbox Live Vision.

=== Classic ===
Classic gameplay is unchanged from the original, but Achievements and Leaderboards are added.

== Features ==
The game features 1080i graphics, Dolby 5.1 audio and an online mode to play against 2 - 4 friends in Deathmatch and Capture the Flag modes, and incorporates Xbox Live Vision support enabling players to see their friends during play.

== Reception ==
The game has received generally mixed reviews. Although it was acclaimed for "the gameplay appeal to make it worth a look" and "the additions made by Atari and Stainless give that much more value", others on the other hand called it an awkward update that gets stuck between misplaced reverence for the original and distracting concessions to modern gaming conventions.

== See also ==
- Battlezone, 1998 reimagining of the 1980 game
- Battlezone, 2016 remake of the 1980 game
