= Carrier Command =

1988 video game

- ZX Spectrum cover art
- Developer: Realtime Games
- Publisher: Rainbird
- Platforms: Amiga, Atari ST, MS-DOS, Amstrad CPC, ZX Spectrum, Commodore 64, Macintosh
- Release: 1988
- Genre: Vehicle simulation
- Mode: Single-player

Carrier Command is a 1988 video game published by Rainbird for the Amiga, Atari ST, IBM PC compatibles, ZX Spectrum, Macintosh, Commodore 64, and Amstrad CPC. Carrier Command is a cross between a vehicle simulation game and a real-time strategy game where players control a robotic aircraft carrier.

== Plot ==
The game is set in the near future, where a team of scientists have developed two robotic aircraft carriers to colonise an archipelago of sixty-four islands. Unfortunately, the more advanced carrier falls into the hands of a terrorist organization, and they plan to conquer the archipelago for their own evil ends. It is the player's job to use the less advanced carrier to colonise the islands and destroy the enemy carrier.

== Gameplay ==
Screenshot from the Atari ST version

Carrier Command is played as a real-time strategy and simulation game with the player having direct control over the friendly vehicles.

Except for the Commodore 64 version, Carrier Command uses filled-in vector graphics to create a three-dimensional view of the game world. The carrier and the vehicles it carries have full 360-degree freedom of rotation. In the Commodore 64 version, the gameplay is from a top-down 2D viewpoint.

The player's carrier, called the ACC Epsilon, is a very complex system with its own weaponry and automatic repair systems. Damage to the carrier is repaired by the automatic repair system. With the exception of the superstructure and the repair system itself, it is possible to fully repair any system in the carrier from 100% damage. If the superstructure reaches 100% damage, the carrier is destroyed and the game is lost.

The carrier carries up to eight Manta remote-controller aircraft and up to eight Walrus remote-controlled amphibious vehicles. Up to four of each can be operational at one time. The remote control of the Manta and Walrus vehicles has to be linked through the carrier. If they venture too far from the carrier, contact with the vehicles is lost, resulting in their destruction. Part of the appeal of the game lies in the control of these auxiliary vehicles.

The islands in the game are flat and rectangular, surrounded by sloping beaches. Neutral islands are covered in trees. A neutral island can be claimed to the player's side by dropping an ACCB (Automated Command Centre Builder) unit from a Walrus to the island. Some islands are claimed by the enemy. To capture an enemy island, a Walrus may fire a virus pod at the opening on the front of the enemy command centre.

== Development ==
After completing the 8-bit conversions of Starglider for Rainbird, the Leeds-based studio Realtime Games was invited to pitch an original title for 16-bit computers. A brainstorming session at Rainbird's London offices produced "a half-page outline of a game based on an aircraft carrier attacking an archipelago of islands." Programmers Ian Oliver and Graeme Baird expanded that outline into a hybrid of real-time strategy and vehicle simulation that would eventually become Carrier Command.

Realtime developed the first version on the Atari ST, then parallelised work on the Amiga, MS-DOS and Macintosh, while Andy Onions single-handedly created the Z80 ports for the ZX Spectrum and Amstrad CPC. Because C proved too slow for 3-D polygon rendering on 8 MHz 68000 machines, the entire engine-terrain generation, flight dynamics and AI was written in 68000 assembly. Oliver later recalled that the two-person core team "worked seven days a week and slept under our desks" and that development "took a lot longer than planned" as they struggled with draw-order glitches and performance bottlenecks.

A 1989 on-site report by ST NEWS confirmed the minimalist set-up at Realtime's Prospect House offices: "We actually arrived at Real Time Games only a few minutes later… Ian Oliver, programmer of 'Carrier Command', had explained the way." The article noted the company's in-house cross-development tools and described Carrier Command as the team's most technically ambitious project to date.

Filled-polygon 3D on the ST and Amiga was complemented by rasterised islands generated from seed values, allowing the game to fit an archipelago of 64 bases into limited memory. Animation work and cockpit graphics were created with bespoke art utilities. Musician Dave Lowe composed the Amiga/ST intro music, while David Whittaker handled the in-game menu theme.

=== Ports and release ===
ZX Spectrum version

Rainbird published the ST and Amiga versions first in 1988, followed by MS-DOS, Spectrum, CPC, Commodore 64 and Macintosh conversions through 1989. A stripped-down console prototype was shown at the January 1989 CES but never released.

== Reception ==
Reception

Review scores
Publication	Score
Your Sinclair	ZX: 94%
ACE	PC: 965/1000; ZX: 923/1000
Amiga Power	Amiga: 78%
Computer Gaming World	PC/Mac: 2.5/5
Happy Computer	Atari ST: 78%
The Games Machine	Atari ST: 98% Amiga: 97% C64: 66%
Zzap!64	Amiga: 92% C64: 64%

Awards
Publication	Award
Crash	Crash Smash
Sinclair User	SU Classic
Your Sinclair	Megagame

The Games Machine awarded the Atari ST and Amiga versions 98% and 97% respectively and ranked Carrier Command the #1 game of 1988. ACE (Advanced Computer Entertainment) scored the PC version 965/1000, while Zzap!64 magazine awarded the Amiga release 92%. The game was ranked the 15th best game of all time by Amiga Power.

Computer Gaming World in 1988 praised the game's blend of strategic and tactical play, recommending it as an improvement over Starglider. A 1992 survey in the magazine of wargames with modern settings gave the game two and a half stars out of five, describing it as a "futuristic arcade game", and two 1994 surveys gave it two stars. The ZX Spectrum version was awarded a "Crash Smash" with 97%, and was awarded 94% by Your Sinclair, and was placed at number 12 in the Your Sinclair official top 100.

In 1991, PC Format named Carrier Command one of the 50 best computer games ever. The editors called it "a splendid mixture of strategic planning and arcade action". Carrier Command was named the 56th best computer game ever by PC Gamer UK in 1997. The editors wrote that it "packs more flight-sim, sea-sim and tank-sim action and strategy than a dozen of your so-called CD-ROM games could manage in a million or more megabytes."

== Legacy ==
Carrier Command was followed by Battle Command, where the player controls a tank.

Hostile Waters: Antaeus Rising (2001) was inspired by Carrier Command and has many similarities.

Carrier Command: Gaea Mission (2012) is a modern remake by Bohemia Interactive's Prague studio. It's a real-time action/strategy game, where the overarching objective is to conquer and control islands. It features a vast 33-island archipelago on the planet-moon Taurus.

Carrier Command 2 was announced in December 2020. It was published by the reconstituted Microprose and was released August 10, 2021 on Steam. Included in the purchase is a virtual reality version of the game. There is a multiplayer component using invitation systems through Steam or by invitation code. Players cooperatively play utilizing different stations aboard the carrier deck. The sequel received mixed reviews, with The Games Machine rating it 6.7/10 points and calling its gameplay "brilliant" but "brought down by obtuse and ancient systems".
