= Hostile Waters: Antaeus Rising =

2001 video game

- Developer: Rage Software
- Publishers: Rage Software; Interplay Entertainment (NA)
- Director: David Percival
- Programmer: Tim Austin
- Artist: John Court
- Writer: Warren Ellis
- Composer: John O'Dowd
- Platform: Microsoft Windows
- Release: EU: 30 March 2001; NA: 12 June 2001
- Genre: Strategy game
- Mode: Single-player

Hostile Waters, released as Hostile Waters: Antaeus Rising in North America, is a 2001 hybrid vehicle and strategy game developed and published by Rage Software for Microsoft Windows. It was inspired by Carrier Command (1988).

The game won several awards and one unofficial award from Rock Paper Shotgun as a "lost classic" or "the best game you've never played".

== Plot ==
Hostile Waters takes place in a Utopian future where war has been abolished. In the year 2012, a revolutionary war takes place between the corrupt and power-hungry politicians, leaders and businessmen (described as the "Old Guard") and the people. The Old Guard were defeated, with only a few of their leaders escaping. By 2032, the world has been rebuilt as a utopia, with the help of nano-technological assemblers, which are used in "creation engines" to create matter from energy and waste, for free. The newly united world is governed from a capital city known as Central.

Missile attacks are suddenly launched against major cities all over the world from an unknown location. This is eventually discovered to be an island chain in the South Pacific Ocean. A response to the missile attacks was a special forces team sent in to investigate the area for preliminary investigations. The Ministry of Intelligence (MinIntel) loses contact with it shortly thereafter. The world government authorises a reactivation of the Antaeus program, a series of warships able to create any weapon of their choosing using their on-board nano-technological creation engine. Two of these were left on the seabed in the case of an emergency, capable of being re-activated and refloating itself. On board are a series of "soulcatcher" chips, a classified 1990s military program researched into for the storage of human brain functions on a silicon chip. The soulcatcher technology was used to store the minds of every crew member ever assigned to an Antaeus vessel.

It is soon discovered that one of the cruisers does not respond to the awakening signal. The other cruiser, however, is refloated and re-activated, with heavy damage to vital ship components. A course is plotted for a nearby disused wet-dock.

As the Antaeus progresses from the wet-dock, unusual biological life-forms are discovered amongst the enemy bases on the islands. The identity of the aggressor firing the missiles is confirmed as the leftovers of the old, pre-Central forces, known as the Cabal. Outnumbering Central's army a thousand to one, they are fighting with thousands of troops and weapons that they hid away when it was apparent that the war was lost. The Antaeus is deployed into the chicane to stop the Cabal's operations there. It's later discovered that along with their superior numbers, they have also biologically engineered a species of organic machines, designed in the popular likeness of extraterrestrials, which they intend to use to create the fear of an alien invasion, to facilitate their taking over the world and the removal of the public use of creation engines.

The Cabal later lose control of the species, which eventually turns on its masters, destroying them. The species starts spreading, modifying the planetary climate and geographical features in an attempt to exterminate humanity and make the planet more hospitable to itself. Having exterminated its creators, the species resolves to cleanse humanity as a whole from the planet using a massive 'disassembler cannon', only to be stopped by the Antaeus. The species subsequently attempts to flee into the cosmos and colonise the surrounding planets and stars, by launching a massive number of 'culture stones' (information devices that also double as creation engines) into space from an enormous, artificially-grown organic "island", the final staging point. Central's only option is to bind the Antaeus' creation engine and the disassembler cannon stolen from the aliens together to create a makeshift bomb, and detonate it at the central "column" containing the culture stones. The plan succeeds, and the Antaeus is sacrificed to save the world.

The final cinematic show the organic disassembler cannon and the Antaeus' creation engine moving closer together and fusing, creating something new. A post-credits scene also shows that two of the species' culture stones have managed to get into space.

== Gameplay ==
Each Mission takes place on and or near a fortified enemy island containing various forms of anti-air and ground defence, with scattered unit-production complexes powered by oil-derricks and fuel containers (which are dependent on the oil-derricks) that the player can destroy to keep the enemy from replacing destroyed forces.

Vehicles are built on the Antaeus and, if desired, land vehicles can be delivered to a location by the air-lifting "magpie". Units are created by providing Antaeus with a number of resources which are obtained at the beginning of the level and debris which are taken from destroyed enemy units and structures. Transport helicopters such as the "Pegasus" can fly to an object and airlift it to the ship-board recycling system with little resources required. The carrier can analyse objects it disassembles at the rear of the Antaeus cruiser, and several of the game's vehicles and items are unlocked by "sampling" them in this fashion.

The game has a number of vehicles that are progressively unlocked as the missions progress. Vehicles contain a number of slots for equipment and a selection of different types of weapons to use in the vehicle. A variety of vehicle equipment combinations can be designed.

Vehicles have an individual damage multiplier such that different vehicles with the same weapon will do different damage. In addition to this, each soul-chip personality specializes in one unit along with specific equipment, which, if equipped will gain them a bonus in efficiency.

== Development ==
The game was developed by 12 people.

== Reception ==
Reception

Aggregate score
Aggregator	Score
Metacritic	80/100

Review scores
Publication	Score
Computer Gaming World	4/5
Edge	8/10
EP Daily	8.5/10
Game Informer	8/10
GameRevolution	B+
GameSpot	8.5/10
GameSpy	79%
IGN	8.7/10
Next Generation	4/5
PC Gamer (US)	80%

The game received "favourable" reviews according to the review aggregation website Metacritic. Carla Harker of NextGen said, "You'll feel like a real battlefield general when you take to the field in Antaeus Rising." Jake The Snake of GamePro said, "If the usual game categories leave you unscathed, get bloodied in these Hostile Waters." (Note: GamePro gave the game 4.5/5 for graphics, and three 4/5 scores for sound, control, and fun factor.)
