= Realtime Games Software =

British video game developer

Realtime Games Software Ltd. was a British computer game developer, founded in 1984 by three Leeds University students: Ian Oliver, Andrew Onions, and Graeme Baird.

Their first game, 3D Tank Duel, was a wireframe graphics game, in the style of Atari, Inc.'s Battlezone arcade game, for the ZX Spectrum. This was followed up with Starstrike 3D, a game based on Atari's Star Wars arcade game. Starfox was published in 1987, and Carrier Command was published in 1988. The company was also involved in porting Elite to IBM PC compatibles and Starglider to the ZX Spectrum.

Realtime's early titles were self-published, while later games were published by Rainbird.

Graeme Baird subsequently went to work for Psygnosis, while Ian Oliver founded Cross Products to produce game development systems for consoles, in a joint venture with Andy Craven of nearby Vektor Grafix.
