= Rommel's Revenge =

1983 video game

- Developer: Design Design
- Publisher: Crystal Computing
- Programmers: ZX Spectrum; Martin S. Horsley
- Platforms: ZX Spectrum, Dragon 32, TRS-80 Color Computer, Amstrad CPC
- Release: 1983: Spectrum; 1984: CoCo, Dragon; 1985: Amstrad
- Genre: Shoot 'em up

Rommel's Revenge is game programmed by Martin Horsley for the ZX Spectrum and published by Crystal Computing in 1983. Ports for the Dragon 32 and TRS-80 Color Computer were released in 1984 It is a clone of the arcade coin-op game Battlezone.
