= Battlezone (2016 video game) =

- North American PlayStation 4 cover art
- Developer(s): Rebellion Developments
- Publisher(s): Rebellion Developments
- Platform(s): PlayStation 4, Microsoft Windows, Xbox One, Nintendo Switch
- Release: PlayStation 4; WW: 13 October 2016; Microsoft Windows; WW: 11 May 2017; Xbox One; WW: 1 May 2018; Switch; WW: 8 November 2018
- Genre(s): Vehicular combat, first-person shooter
- Mode(s): Single-player, multiplayer

Battlezone is an arcade game released by Rebellion in 2016. It is reboot/remake of the original 1980 arcade game. The game was one of the launch titles for PlayStation VR in October 2016.

As with the original, the game features first-person tank combat against an AI-controlled enemy force, but includes co-operative multiplayer and a campaign structure, together with being designed for virtual reality.

== Gameplay ==
The game is played entirely in first person, from within a tank cockpit. The game was originally designed for virtual reality with gamepad control - there are a few HUD elements, such as targeting crosshairs, but most readouts are presented on display panels mounted around the cockpit, together with a holographic top-down radar display.

One player starts a campaign by selecting a difficulty level and campaign length. Up to 3 other players can join the campaign, for a total of 4 players. Players can drop in or out at any time, including during gameplay. Each player chooses a tank that they use for the entire campaign, and each tank comes with an initial weapon loadout. The tank's loadout can be changed at supply points during the campaign.

The objective of the campaign is to travel across the procedurally-generated hex map, ultimately to destroy the enemy's AI core in the volcano at the far end of the map. Each hex contains either a battlezone of one of multiple map types, a supply point, a shield generator, or a random event. Battlezones have different objectives — completing the objective and defeating enemies in the battlezone earns the players "data", and this data can be spent on upgrades or new weapons. Each shield generator destroyed on the map reduces the defences in the final AI core confrontation battlezone.

Players have a shared pool of lives, starting with 3 lives. More can be purchased with data, but the cost increases rapidly. When all players are dead with no lives remaining, the campaign ends in defeat. To avoid spending lives, a downed player can be revived by another player.

A post-launch patch added "classic mode", which recreates the original 1980 wireframe vector game in the virtual reality environment.

== Release ==
The game was first released as an exclusive launch title for PlayStation VR on PlayStation 4 on 13 October 2016. A Microsoft Windows port supporting HTC Vive and Oculus Rift followed in May 2017.

In May 2018 the game was updated and released as Battlezone: Gold Edition, including a new Xbox One port. The Gold Edition added support for non-VR, and included all add-ons previously released as downloadable content. It was a free update for existing Windows and PlayStation 4 owners. A Nintendo Switch port followed on 8 November the same year.

== Reception ==
Reception

Aggregate score
Aggregator	Score
Metacritic	PS4: 66/100; XB1: 75/100; Switch: 73/100

Review scores
Publication	Score
Destructoid	7/10
Edge	7/10
GameSpot	9.4/10
PlayStation Official Magazine – UK	8/10

The game received mixed reviews upon release according to review aggregator Metacritic.
