= Battlezone (1980 video game) =

1980 video game

- North American arcade flyer
- Developer: Atari, Inc.
- Publishers: NA/EU: Atari, Inc.; JP: Sega/Taito
- Designers: Ed Rotberg; Owen Rubin; Roger Hector
- Programmers: Ed Rotberg; Morgan Hoff
- Composer: Jed Margolin
- Platforms: Arcade, Atari 2600, Apple II, VIC-20, Commodore 64, ZX Spectrum, IBM PC, Atari 8-bit, Atari ST
- Release: November 1980: Arcade; NA: November 1980; EU: Late 1980; JP: February 1981 Atari 2600; August 1983 Apple II; April 1984 VIC-20; Early 1984 Commodore 64; June 1984 ZX Spectrum; UK: September 1984 IBM PC; 1984 Atari 8-bit; January 1988 Atari ST; 1988
- Genres: Vehicular combat, first-person shooter
- Mode: Single-player

Battlezone is a 1980 first-person shooter tank combat video game developed and published by Atari, Inc. for arcades; in Japan, it was distributed by Sega and Taito. The player controls a tank which is attacked by other tanks and missiles. Using a small radar scanner along with the terrain window, the player can locate enemies and obstacles around them in the barren landscape. Its innovative use of 3D graphics made it a huge hit, with approximately 15,000 cabinets sold.

With its use of three-dimensional vector graphics, the game is considered to be the first true 3D arcade game that has a first-person perspective, the "first big 3D success" in the video game industry, and the first successful first-person shooter video game in particular. This made it a milestone for first-person shooter games.

The game was primarily designed by Ed Rotberg, who was mainly inspired by the top-down shooter game Tank (1974). The system was based on vector hardware designed by Wendi Allen (Note: Known then as Howard Delman.) which was introduced in Lunar Lander and saw success with Asteroids. The 3D hardware which drove the program saw use in future games, including Red Baron (1981). Battlezone is considered to be one of the greatest video games of all time.

== Gameplay ==
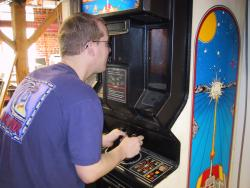
Two joysticks control the player's tank.

The game uses wireframe vector graphics displayed on a black and white vector monitor. A colored overlay tints the display green for the bottom 4/5 where the action takes place, and red for the top 1/5 where the score and radar screen are displayed.

The player drives a tank using two joysticks, one controlling the right tread and the other the left. By moving the joysticks relative to each other, the tank can move forward or reverse (both moved in the same direction), turn on the spot to the left or right (one forward, one back) or move and turn at a slower rate (one forward or backward, one neutral). The right-side stick also has a fire button on top, which shoots the player's gun in the direction the tank is currently facing.

Gameplay takes place on a flat plane with a mountainous horizon featuring an erupting volcano, a distant crescent moon, and various geometric solids (in vector outline) like pyramids and blocks. The geometric solid obstacles are indestructible and can obstruct the movement of a player's tank while also blocking shots and can be used as shields. The action surrounds the player in all directions, including off-screen locations, forcing the player to locate the enemy using the radar display at the top of the screen.

There are three types of enemy craft that appear during play, one at a time. At the start of a game, the enemy is dominated by slow tanks that are not particularly difficult to hit even when moving. As the game continues, missiles begin to appear in place of the enemy tanks; these move much faster and are more difficult to hit. Finally, the much faster supertanks appear at higher levels, which are not only harder to hit, but also attack more aggressively.

Periodically saucer-shaped UFOs will appear while making a distinctive sound to announce their presence; these do not show up on the radar and do not attack the user, but can be shot for bonus points. This is the only object that may appear while other enemies are already present.

There is a gameplay modification at 100,000 points if the proper conditions are met. When executed properly, the next appearing supertank will not attack, but will instead retreat. A tank icon will then appear at right on qualified high score listings.

== Cabinet ==
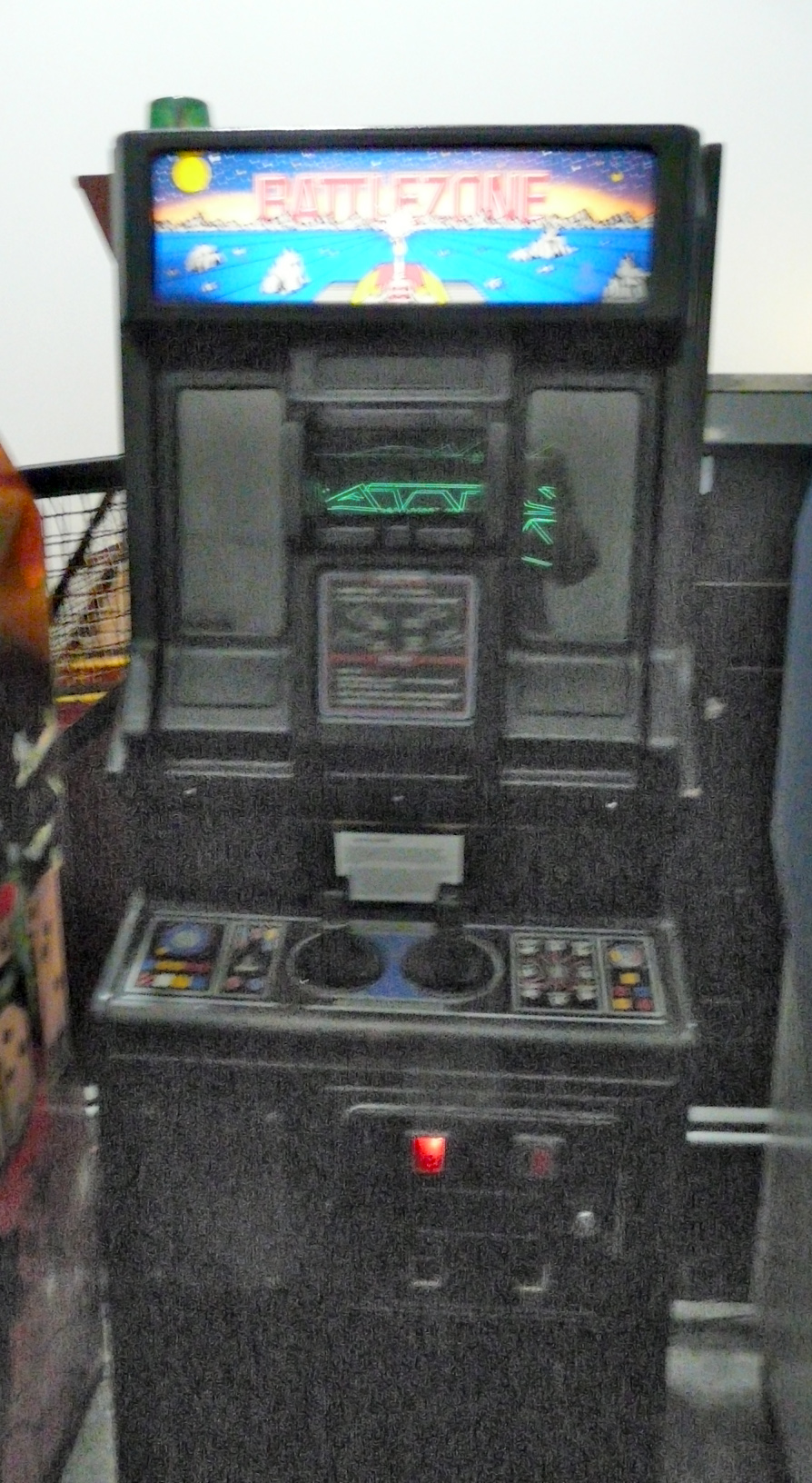
Battlezone uses 3D vector graphics viewed through a "periscope".

Battlezone is housed in an upright full-sized arcade cabinet with a "periscope" viewfinder. The viewfinder restricted the player's view so that the display appeared to be naturally limited to resemble a scope. The game action can also be viewed from the sides of the viewfinder for spectators to watch. The game's periscope viewfinder is similar to earlier submarine shooting arcade games, notably Midway's arcade video game Sea Wolf (1976) and Sega's electro-mechanical game Periscope (1966). A later version of the cabinet removed the periscope and raised the monitor to a more normal position to improve visibility to non-players and improve ergonomics for players who could not reach the periscope. A smaller, "cabaret" version of the cabinet has the screen angled upwards and no periscope.

The large controller handles were adapted from earlier gear-shift controllers used on racing games, modified with a new stick shape that has internal ribs to make them stronger and adding rubber centering bellows. The right stick has a raised and LED illuminated fire button on top, and the controls were completed with a similar LED illuminated start button on the cabinet. There were two speakers, one each above and below the 19-inch monitor.

== Development ==
With the success of the Cinematronics vector graphics games, Atari's Grass Valley engineering labs decided to build their own version of a vector display system known as "QuadraScan" that offered a resolution of 1024 x 768. Once it was up and running, they delivered the prototype unit to Atari headquarters where it was given to Wendi Allen and Rick Moncrief to develop it into a unit suitable for arcade video game use. Allen decided to reimplement the driver system using analog electronics instead of digital, simplifying it and lowering its cost.

While working on the system, Allen suggested they use it to implement a version of Lunar Lander. While Allen worked on the driver hardware and Moncrief on the display system, Rich Moore wrote the software for the game. Lunar Lander was released in August 1979, Atari's first vector game, but was not a great success with only 4,830 units manufactured.

Another team at Atari consisting of Lyle Rains, Ed Logg, and Steve Callfee was working on a raster graphics game called Planet Grab. When they saw Lunar Lander, they asked about using the same system for their game, and the result was Asteroids. Released in November 1979, it went on to be Atari's most successful game, with 55,000 units sold.

With the system now proving a huge success in the arcades, Morgan Hoff organized a brainstorming session at Atari to consider additional uses for the hardware. Around the same time, Atari had also been experimenting with early 3D displays using a custom math circuit known simply as the "Math Box", developed by Jed Margolin and Mike Albaugh and comprising a specialized 16-bit Arithmetic logic unit (ALU) including four AMD Am2901 4-bit bit-slice ALUs.. The idea of using the math box with the vector hardware seemed like a winner, and the idea of a tank game was raised at the meeting, although Hoff could not remember exactly who introduced the idea.

The game's design was led by Ed Rotberg. He cited Atari's top-down arcade shooter game Tank (1974) as the primary inspiration behind Battlezone, essentially a 3D version of that game. While Battlezone also has similarities to a first-person tank simulation for the PLATO system, Panther, Rotberg said he had never played that game before, but had heard of it; he stated that it "may have inspired whoever originally suggested the idea at the brainstorming meeting where it was proposed, but I seriously doubt it".

Owen Rubin, who shared an office with Ed Rotberg, had the idea of making the volcano in the background erupt, and coded the animation for it.

== Ports ==
In the 1980s, Battlezone was ported to the Apple II, Atari 2600, Commodore 64, VIC-20, IBM PC compatibles, ZX Spectrum, and later the Atari 8-bit computers and Atari ST. The ports to non-Atari systems were from Atarisoft. The ZX Spectrum version was published by Quicksilva.

The Atari 8-bit version was released on cartridge in 1987 in the styling of the then-new Atari XEGS. An Atari 5200 port was scheduled for release in November 1983, but was cancelled.

The Atari 2600 version uses raster graphics instead of vectors and has a third person view where the tank is visible.

The Atari ST port contains large parts of the original 6502 code which is emulated.

== Reception ==
Battlezone was released in November 1980 and was a hit. Although not as successful as Asteroids, Battlezone eventually produced another 15,000 sales for Atari.

Battlezone was well received, earning an Honorable Mention for "Best Commercial Arcade Game" in 1982 at the Third Annual Arkie Awards. It was runner-up, behind Pac-Man. David and Sandy Small called it "addictive" and mentioned the Battlezone Tunnel Vision, which makes the players drive strangely during rush hour. In a more recent review, Eurogamer stated that "Atari's designers came up with some incredibly inventive and interesting games before their decline. Battlezone is one of the finer examples" and rated it 8 out of 10. Fox gives it a 4 out of 5 rating in The Video Games Guide, although he admits this might perturb some readers. In 1996, GamesMaster ranked the arcade version 97th on their "Top 100 Games of All Time".

Computer and Video Games magazine awarded the Spectrum version of Battlezone 30 out of 40 points, praising its technical achievements such as the implementation of hidden line removal. The reviewer compared the game to 3D Tank Duel, a similar game by Realtime Games Software, opining that the latter was marginally superior to the official port.

== The Bradley Trainer ==
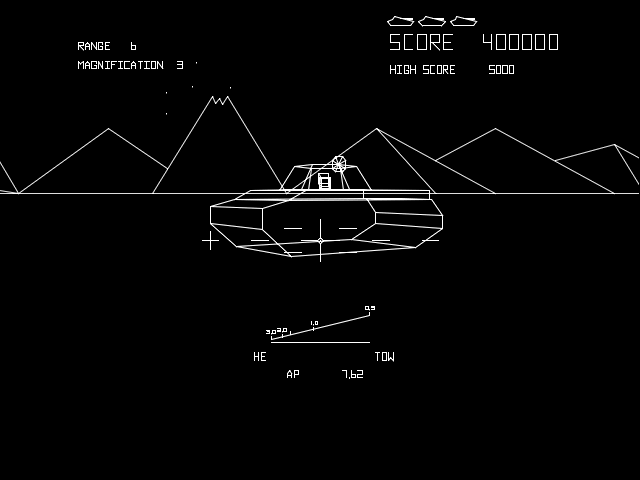
A standard enemy tank in the player's sights in The Bradley Trainer

A version called The Bradley Trainer (also known as Army Battlezone or Military Battlezone) was designed for use by the U.S. Army as targeting training for gunners on the Bradley Fighting Vehicle. It was commissioned by a consultant group of retired generals.

Approaching Atari in December 1980, some developers within Atari refused to work on the project because of its association with the Army, most notably original Battlezone programmer Ed Rotberg. Rotberg only joined the project after he was promised by management that he would never be asked to do anything with the military in the future. According to Rotberg, it took him three months of constant work to develop the prototype version of The Bradley Trainer. Only two were produced; one was delivered to the Army and is presumed lost, and the other is in the private collection of Scott Evans, who found it by a dumpster in the rear parking lot at Midway Games.

The gunner yoke was based on the Bradley Fighting Vehicle control and was later re-used in the popular Star Wars game. The Bradley Trainer differs dramatically from the original Battlezone as it features helicopters, missiles, and machine guns; furthermore, the actual tank does not move, but the guns simply rotate.

== Legacy ==
Due to its use of first-person pseudo 3D graphics combined with a "viewing goggle" that the player puts his or her face into, Battlezone is sometimes considered the first virtual reality arcade video game.

=== Related games and rereleases ===
- In 1993, the replicated version of Battlezone was included in Microsoft Arcade for Windows 3.1, Windows 95, and Mac.
- Battlezone 2000 for the Atari Lynx was released in 1995.
- It was included in the 1996 Battlezone / Super Breakout combo for the Game Boy.
- Activision developed an authorized Battlezone game in 1998. Despite having the same name, it is not an arcade game, but a more complicated tank piloting strategy game. Battlezone II: Combat Commander is the 1999 sequel.
- A re-imagining of Battlezone was developed by Paradigm Entertainment and released for the PlayStation Portable.
- In 2008, an updated version of Battlezone was released on Xbox Live Arcade by Atari.
- In 2013, Rebellion Developments bought the Battlezone franchise from the Atari bankruptcy proceedings. In 2016, a remaster of the 1998 game, titled Battlezone 98 Redux, was released for Windows, and an unrelated virtual reality game titled Battlezone was released for the PlayStation 4. It was ported to Microsoft Windows in 2017 and to the Xbox One and Nintendo Switch in the following year, as Battlezone: Gold Edition. It supports Oculus Rift, HTC Vive and PlayStation VR.

=== Clones and inspired games ===
- 3D Combat Zone (1983) by Jon Ritman published by Artic Computing for the ZX Spectrum.
- Stellar 7 (1983) for the Apple II and Commodore 64.
- Robot Tank (1983) by Activision for the Atari 2600 is similar to the official port of Battlezone.
- Encounter! (1983) for the Atari 8-bit computers and Commodore 64 is also similar to 2600 Battlezone, with solid character-mode graphics instead of wireframe 3D graphics. It includes the missiles and saucers of the original.
- 3D Tank Zone (1983) for the Acorn Electron and BBC Micro by Dynabyte; Battlezone (2023) remake by Rocketeer.
- 3D Tank Duel (1984) and Rommel's Revenge (1983) for the ZX Spectrum.
- Rommel 3D (1985) for the TRS-80 Color Computer.
- bzone for Domain/OS, later rewritten for the X Window System and Macintosh.
- Spectre (1991) for the Macintosh.
- BZ for the Silicon Graphics workstations added network play.
- Stramash Zone (2018) was self-published for the Vectrex.
- BZFlag, an online multiplayer free and open-source tank game.

== See also ==
- Golden age of arcade video games
