= Zmodeler =

3D modelling application

ZModeler
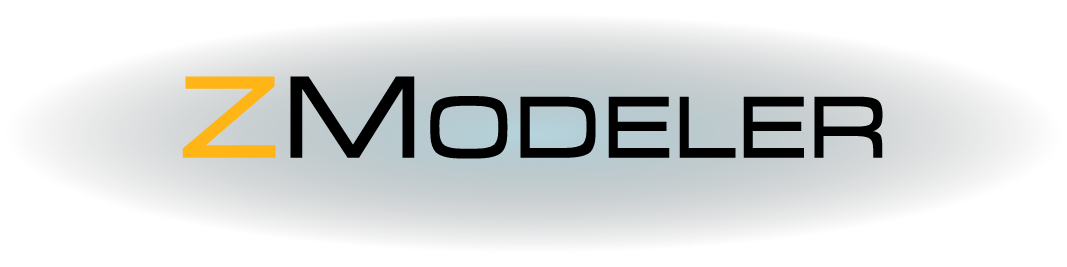
- Developer: Oleg Melashenko
- Stable release: 3.3.1 / May 26, 2024
- Operating system: Microsoft Windows
- Type: 3D computer graphics
- License: Trialware
- Website: www.zmodeler3.com www.zmodeler2.com

ZModeler (short for Zanoza Modeler) is a 3D modelling application developed by Oleg Melashenko, designed primarily for creating and modifying models for use in video games. Initially released in the early 2000s, ZModeler has become a popular tool among modders and game developers for building custom vehicles, characters, and other in-game assets.

ZModeler is particularly known for its support of game-specific formats and workflows, making it a preferred choice for modding titles such as the Grand Theft Auto series, Euro Truck Simulator, American Truck Simulator, 18 Wheels of Steel, and Midtown Madness, among others. It supports various import/export filters tailored to the requirements of these games.

Later versions, including ZModeler3, introduced enhanced features like better texture management, shader support, real-time rendering previews, and compatibility with more modern file types. ZModeler continues to be actively developed, with updates focusing on expanded support for newer game engines and user-requested features.

Although not as widely used in general-purpose 3D modeling as tools like Blender or 3ds Max, ZModeler maintains a niche user base due to its specialized toolset and ease of integration with modding pipelines for specific simulation and open-world games.

== ZModeler versions ==
ZModeler was capable of complex modeling and Importing. On later versions it supported important modeling functions such as extruding, or beveling.

Version 1 did not support polygons other than triangles, or NURBs, or other forms of modeling other than polygonal and splines. It came with filters to import and export meshes of other formats. However, there are more formats other than the included ones for download in various websites. ZModeler did not have a lighting system, although lighting can be made by using gradients for reflection maps.

== Updates ==
Since version 2, ZModeler is no longer offered as a feature-rich freeware. Once activated, it becomes possible to use filters and plugins to import and export models from various other formats, including formats for computer games. ZModeler2 has a new rendering engine and adds several other functions. It had a very different user interface from ZModeler1. In addition, ZModeler2 supported quadrilateral polygons, a major improvement over ZModeler1.

Zmodeler3 arrived with changes to the material browser, UV Tile, which replaced the "Scale" of the texture map. New interface and Levels of Detail were among the new features.

The last stable version released was 3.3.1 (Build 1242).

== Rendering ==
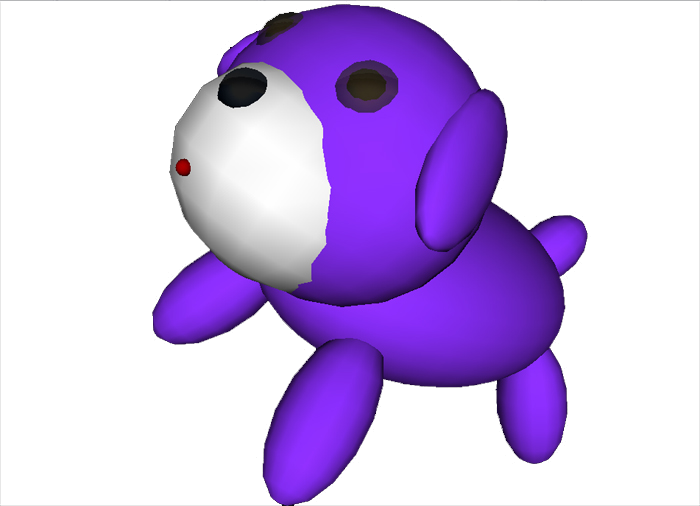
Model of a Purple Puppy, created and rendered with ZModeler 1.07.

No version of ZModeler comes with support for making final scene renderings. Currently, scene renderings can only be made by taking a screen capture. This method, however, does affect the output quality because no post-processing, such as anti-aliasing, is performed on the final image. Any necessary manual post-processing can, for example, be done by rescaling a high-output rendering of the scene with any graphics software.

== Supported formats ==
ZModeler 1
Game/Software	File Format
ATI N-Patch	.m
3Ds Max	.3ds
Mafia	.4ds
BIN 3D Meshes	.bin
Colin McRae Rally 2	.c3d
NFS5 mesh data	.crp

ZModeler 2
Game/Software	File Format
3DS	.3ds
BF2	.staticmesh, .skinnedmesh, .bundledmesh
EA NFS	.bin
Clipping Point .VTR	.cp
18 Wheels of Steel	.pmg
Emergency3	.v3o
FlatOut	.bmg
GTA IV	.wtf, .wtr, .wtd
GTA Trilogy (Classic)	.dff
Juiced 2 Grabber	.jfs
Live For Speed	.vob
LockOn	.lom
MotoGranPri2	.mesh
NFS Hot Pursuit 2010	.bin
NFS Shift	.meb, .bml
RaceDriver3	.p3d
SCS Soft	.psm
ISI gMotor	.gmt
Richard Burns Rally	.scg
Test Drive Unlimited	.3dg
Test Drive Unlimited 2	.3dg
Virtual Tuning	.vmsh .vloc
WaveFront OBJ	.obj
Xpand Rally	.3da

== Primitive objects ==
Both ZModeler versions come with a standard list of primitive objects that can be easily created. After determining the size and location of the object, a dialog box will pop up, allowing the user to specify the object name, and the "horizontal steps" and "vertical steps". The list of primitive objects include spheres, cones, cubes, cylinders, tubes, and tori.

== Format ==
The ZModeler file format has an extension of "*.Z3D". The ZModeler2 file format is different from the ZModeler 1x series' file format. Although ZModeler2 can open ZModeler 1 files, ZModeler 1 cannot open ZModeler2 files. Both formats have the same file extension. They are also both capable of storing unsupported data. Since ZModeler 2.2.4, Z3D files are capable of storing the textures, although this feature must be enabled. On older versions instead, textures are separately stored as bitmaps, PNG, or other supported files types.
