= Doubly linked face list =

In applied mathematics, a doubly linked face list (DLFL) is an efficient data structure for storing 2-manifold mesh data. The structure stores linked lists for a 3D mesh's faces, edges, vertices, and corners. The structure guarantees the preservation of the manifold property.
