= Bureau of Overseas Buildings Operations =

US State Department unit

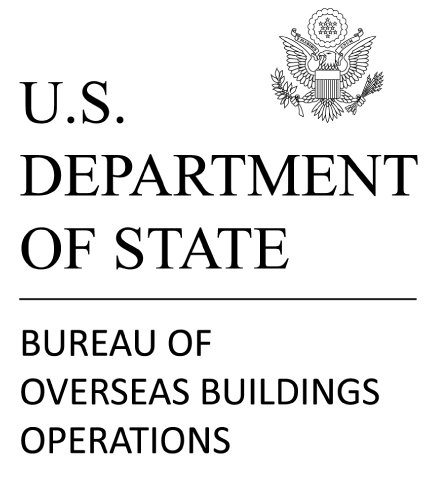

Bureau overview
- Jurisdiction: Executive branch of the United States
- Headquarters: 2201 C Street NW, Washington, D.C., United States
- Bureau executive: Kimberly A. Badenhop, Acting Director
- Parent department: U.S. Department of State
- Parent bureau: Office of the Under Secretary of State for Management
- Website: state.gov/obo

The United States Department of State’s Bureau of Overseas Buildings Operations (OBO) is responsible for overseeing the construction, management, and operations of U.S. diplomatic facilities around the world.

== Mission ==
OBO’s mission is to efficiently deliver safe, secure, and effective facilities, providing the platform for diplomacy which advances our national interests. It sets priorities for the design, construction, acquisition, maintenance, use, and sale of real property, as well as the allocation of sale proceeds. OBO has a $75B portfolio replacement value and a global presence spanning over 280 locations throughout the world.

== History ==
OBO has its origins in the Foreign Service Buildings Commission, which was established in 1926 under the Foreign Service Buildings Act. This legislation granted the Secretary of State the authority to acquire by purchase, construction, or exchange sites and buildings in foreign capitals and other foreign cities; to maintain, repair, improve, and refurbish these properties; and to dispose of properties that become surplus, underutilized, or uneconomical. The act also granted the Secretary of State the authority to provide residential and office space and necessary related facilities to other agencies overseas whose employees are under the authority of the Chief of Mission. The creation of the Foreign Service Buildings Commission was a response to public concerns regarding the state of American diplomatic posts abroad. Over the years, several pivotal events triggered significant changes within OBO and its predecessor organizations.

One such event was the attack on the U.S. embassy in Beirut in 1983, which prompted the Advisory Panel on Overseas Security to charge the then Office of Foreign Buildings Operations with the task of replacing embassies and consulates that failed to meet essential security standards. However, challenges such as the availability of suitable sites and funding led to the abandonment of over a third of the initially planned projects.

Fifteen years later, after the bombings of the U.S. embassies in Nairobi and Dar es Salaam in 1998, the Secretary of State established the Overseas Presence Advisory Panel. This panel was tasked with assessing the United States’ global presence and the condition of the Department's facilities. Their final report contained both broad and specific recommendations for the future of the Department's building program.

Among the observations made in the report were concerns about unsafe, overcrowded, deteriorating, and substandard conditions at numerous U.S. embassies and consulates. The panel's findings also indicated that over 80 percent of diplomatic facilities abroad were vulnerable to future attacks. In response, the Secure Embassy Construction and Counterterrorism Act (SECCA) was enacted in 1999, which enshrined security requirements for Department facilities overseas.

As a result of these developments, the Department elevated the Office of Foreign Buildings Operations to the Bureau of Overseas Buildings Operations. The newly designated Bureau was charged with replacing more than 180 aging embassies that did not meet all security standards, marking an unprecedented endeavor in the Department's history. To achieve this goal, the Department collaborated closely with the Office of Management and Budget and Congress to secure reliable funding commitments.

=== Program Evolution ===
OBO’s history is defined by distinct periods or eras. Its initial era was characterized by a focus on adaptivity, involving the acquisition and conversion of extant residential properties for diplomatic purposes before progressing to the deliberate design and construction of purpose-built facilities.

In the subsequent Modern era, facilities were constructed that more aptly embodied U.S. values, including democracy, transparency, and diplomacy with host countries where operational activities were conducted.

The transition into the Security and Excellence era saw a discernible shift towards prioritizing security measures and establishing secure platforms for both property users and visitors.

Currently, OBO is in the Effective Facilities Solutions era, representing the culmination of the Bureau’s accumulated experience and exemplifying the commitment to provide future-ready, adaptable facilities.

== Managing Directorates ==
=== Planning & Real Estate ===
The Planning & Real Estate (PRE) directorate within OBO is responsible for the oversight and implementation of the U.S. Department of State’s building and real estate programs. This directorate focuses on strategically managing real estate for U.S. diplomatic facilities abroad, ensuring that these facilities are located in suitable, secure, and functional spaces, while also adhering to host country regulations and environmental objectives.

The PRE directorate advises the OBO Director on long-range and strategic facility planning and real property programs and policies for the Department of State and the U.S. Government community serving abroad. Additionally, PRE oversees the Department’s asset management program, including real property acquisition and disposal plans, and conducts financial evaluations of properties proposed for acquisition abroad. The directorate is also responsible for strategic facility planning, long-term master planning, property negotiations with foreign governments, the Capital Security Cost-Sharing Program, and reporting Federal Real Property Profile (FRPP) for the State Department. Furthermore, it manages the sale and decommissioning of properties.

=== Program Development, Coordination, & Support ===
The Office of Building Operations (OBO) Program Development, Coordination, and Support (PDCS) directorate is tasked with the responsibility of managing and coordinating program activities associated with U.S. diplomatic facilities abroad, particularly those related to construction and rehabilitation programs. The PDCS directorate works to inform the OBO Director of the development and execution of funded capital construction and noncapital programs to ensure that such efforts comply with the goals and priorities set out by the United States government. It also helps in providing information and advice on the selection of architectural and engineering firms for OBO design contracts and develops policies, standards, and procedures required to fulfill its mission.

=== Construction, Facility, & Security Management ===
The Construction, Facility, & Security Management (CFSM) directorate within OBO is primarily responsible for the construction, security, and maintenance of the State Department's diplomatic platforms across the globe. This directorate formulates management criteria, guidelines, and policies for new office buildings, major renovations, and upgrade projects for Department facilities abroad. These standards encompass security and safety, ensuring the protection and efficient functioning of U.S. diplomatic facilities worldwide.

=== Artistic & Cultural Diplomatic Commodities ===
The Artistic & Cultural Diplomatic Commodities (ACDC) Directorate within OBO supports the cultural, representational, and residential aspects of U.S. diplomatic facilities abroad. The directorate houses Art in Embassies, the Office of Cultural Heritage, and the Residential Design and Furnishings Office, which together provide expertise in art, cultural stewardship, and residential design to enhance U.S. Government spaces overseas.

== Art in Embassies ==
For over five decades, Art in Embassies (AIE) has played a leading role in U.S. public diplomacy through a focused mission of vital cross-cultural dialogue and understanding through the visual arts and dynamic artist exchange. The Museum of Modern Art first envisioned this global visual arts program in 1953, and President John F. Kennedy formalized it in 1963. Today, Art in Embassies is an official visual arts office within the U.S. Department of State, engaging over 20,000 participants globally, including artists, museums, galleries, universities, and private collectors. It encompasses over 200 venues in 189 countries. Professional curators and registrars create and ship about 60 exhibitions per year, and since 2000, over 70 permanent collections have been installed in the Department’s diplomatic facilities throughout the world.

== Office of Cultural Heritage ==
The Office of Cultural Heritage was established in 2015, under the Bureau of Overseas Buildings Operations. The Office of Cultural Heritage implements a stewardship program for the care of the Department of State’s culturally, historically, and architecturally significant properties and collections through research, conservation, educational programs, exhibit design, and maintenance protocols.

Cultural Heritage staff undertakes research to determine historical significance and conducts condition assessments to inform treatment recommendations for historic properties and collections. The product of this research is used to guide the future management and care of the portfolio of buildings and objects. Information is also shared with the public through outreach and education opportunities such as those found on this website and through programs like the Secretary of State’s Register for Culturally Significant Property.

Using modern technology and drawing on in-house expertise in historic preservation and fine arts conservation, the Office of Cultural Heritage oversees special projects for diplomatic posts abroad when historic buildings and collections are affected. This requires collaboration with and education for facilities managers, OBO design professionals, and outside contractors to meet required preservation codes and best practices.

The Office of Cultural Heritage regularly works with student groups studying historic preservation by hosting them at a historic embassy abroad for a week of learning and research. This exchange allows for a hands-on experience for young preservation professionals and adds to the knowledge about these properties through the student’s findings and presentations.

Whether for an ambassador’s residence, an embassy, or with a public institution, the Office of Cultural Heritage creates exhibits that showcase American diplomatic history around the world. These exhibits utilize the Department of State’s collection of cultural objects and historic buildings as well as partnerships with public and private institutions through loan programs. While many of these are only viewable by invited guests to our overseas properties, the Office of Cultural Heritage seeks to make them accessible to the public.

== The Office of Policy and Program Analysis ==
This office is responsible for managing the bureau's overall engagements with Congress, the Office of the Inspector General (OIG), and the Government Accountability Office (GAO) and is the central focal point for conveying oversight and accountability information to these external entities. RM/P is also responsible for managing the bureau's strategic planning development, implementation, monitoring, and evaluation processes and products such as the Functional Bureau Strategy (FBS), Bureau Resource Request (BRR) submission, Annual Performance Plan/Annual Performance Review, among others. The office coordinates the development of OBO policy directives and revisions to the Foreign Affairs Manual and Foreign Affairs Handbooks (FAM/FAH) and internal Policy and Standard Operating Procedures Directives, and provides policy development assistance to all OBO Offices. Lastly, RM/P manages all responses to OIG Hotline Complaints, FOIA requests, and Congressional inquiries.
