= Virtual home design software =

Type of computer-aided design software

Virtual home design software is a type of computer-aided design software intended to help architects, designers, and residents in homes preview their design implementations on-the-fly. It is a dynamic live floor plan or house plan for interior design.

These products may differ from traditional homeowner design software and other online design tools in that they may use HTML5 to ensure dynamic previews of changes. This category of software as a service may put an emphasis on usability, speed, and customization.

== Background ==
Residents, contractors, and architects use virtual home exterior design software to help visualize changes to designs. Since virtual home design suites that use HTML5 are able to rapidly propagate changes to the home design, users can A/B test designs much more efficiently than with previous iterations of online design software.

Virtual home design software has found widespread usage among homeowners who have suffered property damage, as server-side, HTML5-based design software is ideal for homeowners who wish to see what certain products will look like on damaged areas of their houses. Many apps are aimed at use by non-professionals. Ikea have experimented with this technology and made various tools available online to the general public.

Augmented reality has also been used.

== Examples ==
Several manufacturers use virtual home design software to display their products online. These companies that utilize virtual home design software include GAF Materials Corporation, James Hardie, Exterior Portfolio, and CertainTeed. Some companies, such as Design My Exterior, have built virtual home design software that is not limited to products or brands in order to allow for greater flexibility by the end-user. Design My Exterior also uses ImageMapster in order to generate a greater range of options with less processing time.

Live Home 3D is a virtual home design software for Microsoft Windows and macOS. Magicplan is a web app with AR.

== Future applications ==
Several companies are experimenting with virtual reality for architecture. They design virtual homes and allow customers to walk around with the help of a VR headset (such as the Occulus Rift). This way, customers get a realistic, true-to-scale idea of the result.

== Gallery ==
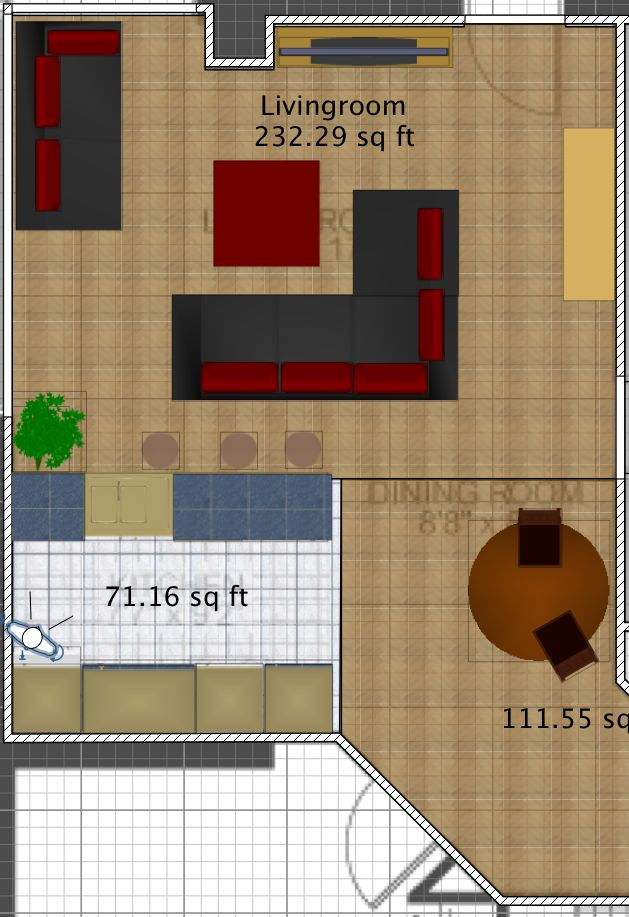
Sweet Home 3D Layout

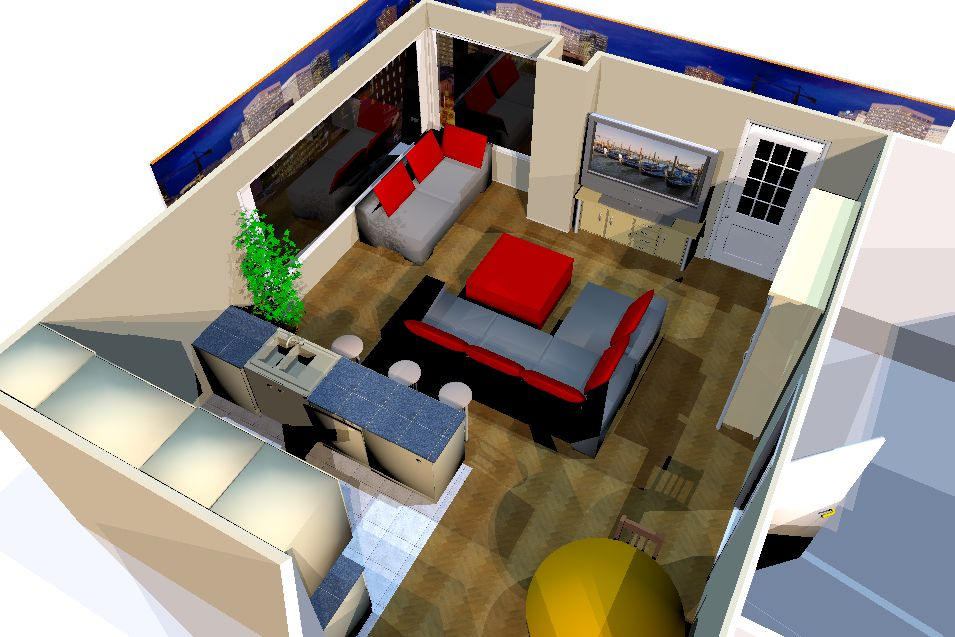
3D view

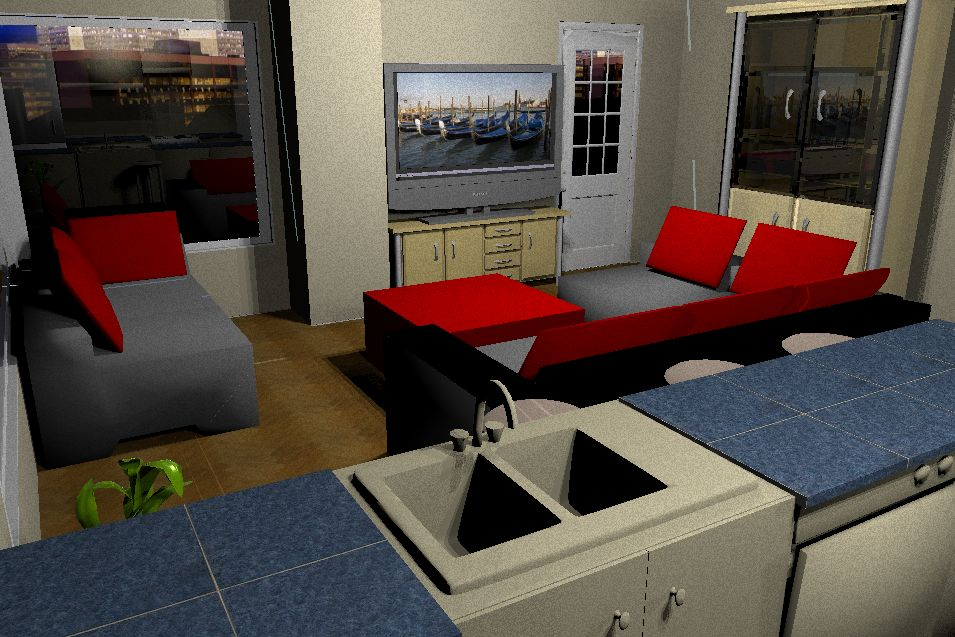
Render

== See also ==
- List of BIM software
