= Disaster restoration =

Restoring damage caused by natural disasters

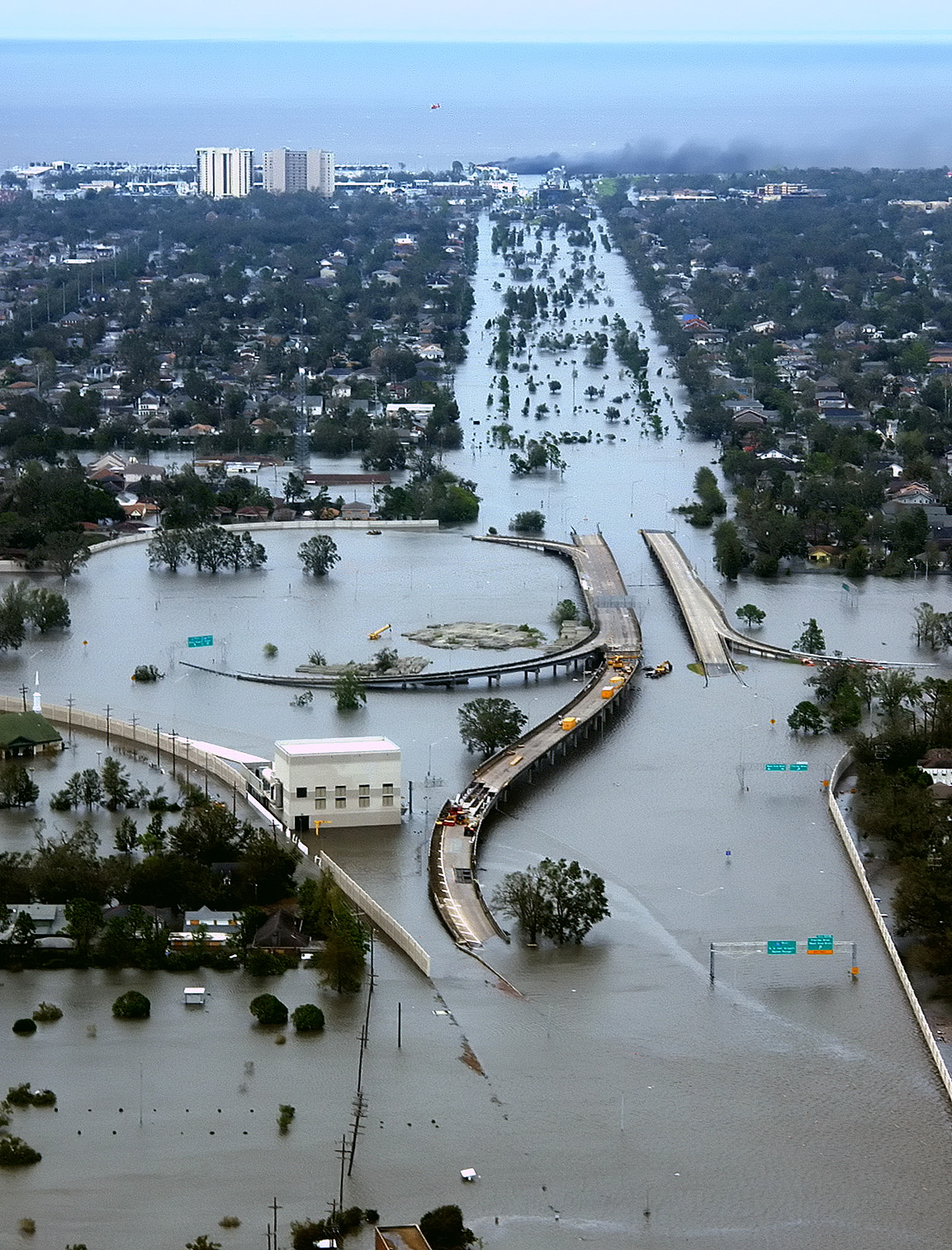
Aftermath of Hurricane Katrina in New Orleans

Disaster restoration refers to the process of repairing and restoring property damaged by natural disasters such as floods, hurricanes, wildfires, or earthquakes. It typically involves various services such as structural repairs and water damage restoration, fire damage restoration, mold remediation, and content restoration.

== Water Damage Restoration ==
Water damage restoration begins with a preliminary inspection of the building to determine the safety of the structure, severity of the damage, and source of the water. Any standing water must then be pumped out of the structure so that the affected areas can be properly dried. Due to the threat of mold, items and surfaces have to be thoroughly sanitized, after which repairs can take place. The process of disinfection is especially important here as all items involved can be affected. Therefore, proper protective equipment that covers your entire body is strongly recommended throughout the whole process. Other possible threats include household utilities like electricity and gas that can pose a serious threat in a flooded structure.

== Fire Damage Restoration ==
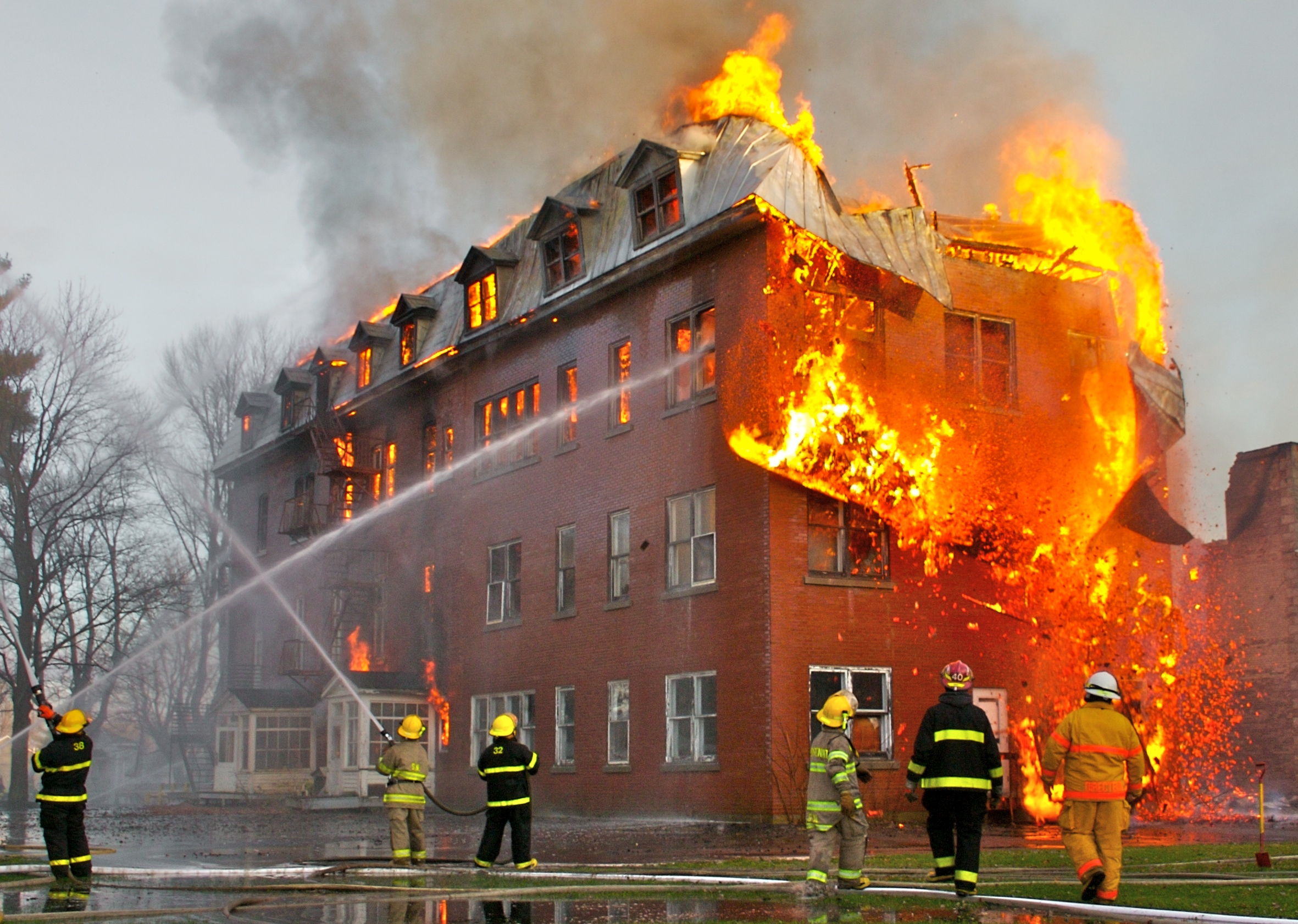
Fire inside an abandoned convent in Massueville, Quebec, Canada

Before entering any building exposed to fire damage, it is recommended to consult local officials such as the fire department or building inspectors to determine if it is safe. Fire damage in buildings is often accompanied by extensive water damage that occurs from the extinguishing process. Aside from those relevant to water damage, smoke and soot are the primary concerns with fire damage restoration. These both pose a serious health risk so full body protective equipment is advised when working around it. Assuming they are salvageable, any items damaged in a fire or exposed to the aftermath need to be thoroughly cleaned to avoid health hazards and further contamination with other objects. Removing smoke odor can prove to be challenging and will often involve the use of chemicals such as detergents, bleach, and TSP.

== Mold Remediation ==
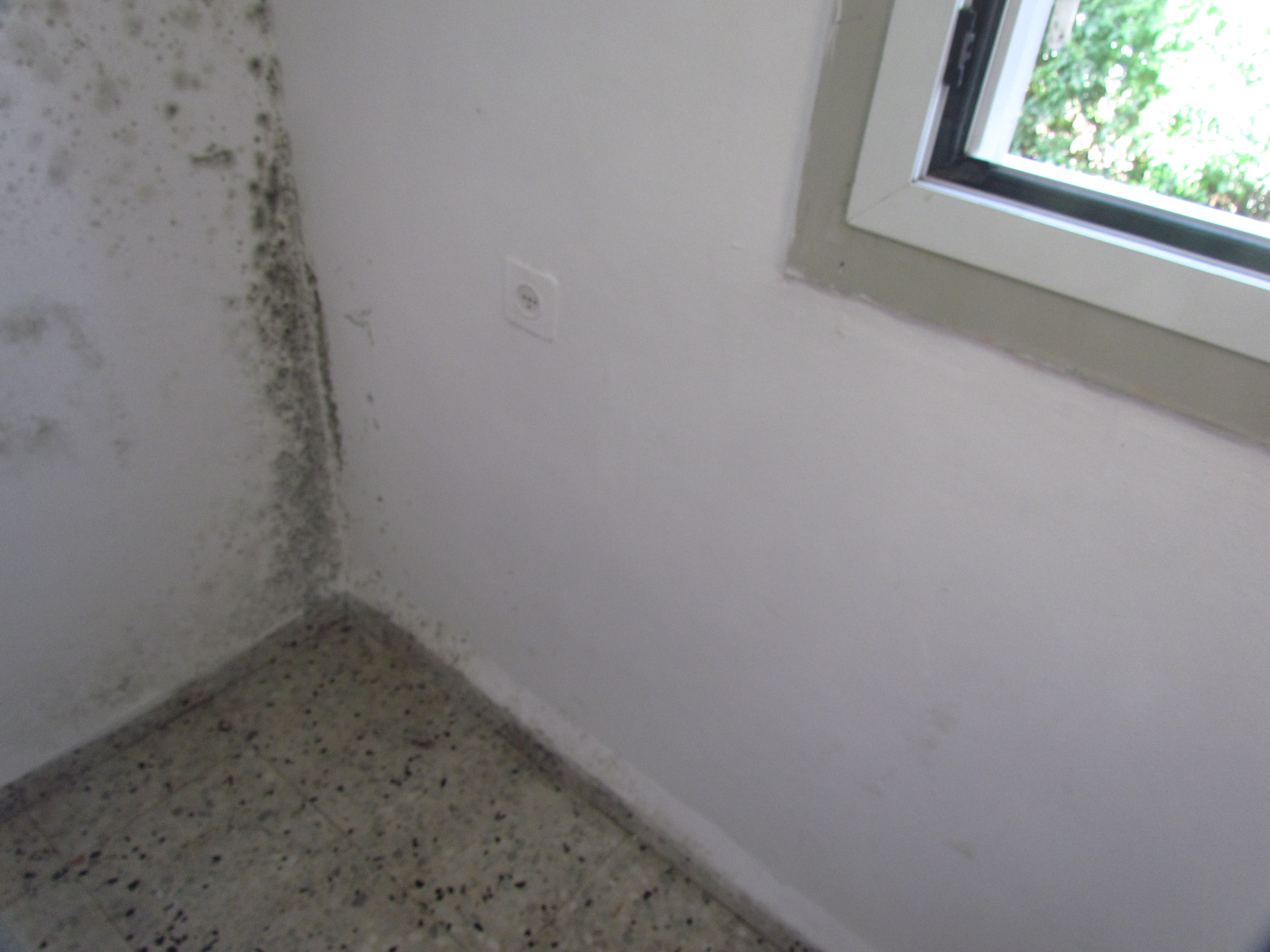
An example of indoor mold on a wall

Mold poses a serious threat to anyone working around it due to its ability to spread in the air, with the skin, eyes, mouth, and lungs being most susceptible. As such, full body protective equipment is recommended when cleaning it up. Additionally, those with preexisting respiratory conditions such as asthma or COPD should take extra precautions to avoid mold exposure. Mold growth occurs most commonly due to water damage in buildings and can grow on any surface, including the backside of walls and ceiling tiles. Whether or not a material can be salvaged is largely determined by how porous it is. Non-porous materials such as glass are able to be fully cleaned while something such as drywall may prove impossible to salvage depending on exposure time. Semi-porous materials like wood can often be saved if properly dried and disinfected in a reasonable amount of time. When used safely, chemicals such as bleach and detergent are effective in removing mold. Extra safety precautions when cleaning up mold may include opening windows to increase ventilation, misting surfaces with water to prevent airborne spores, or storing contaminated items in an airtight container.

== The industry ==
The disaster restoration industry, encompassing services such as fire damage repair and mold remediation, has experienced significant growth in recent decades due to a confluence of factors. Severe natural disasters, coupled with increasing development in disaster-prone areas, have created a steady demand for restoration services. While historically dominated by local family-owned businesses, the industry has witnessed a notable consolidation trend driven by private equity firms seeking to capitalize on its recession-proof nature.

=== Market size ===
The global post-storm remediation market is projected to expand from $70 billion in 2024 to $92 billion by 2029, reflecting the enduring demand for restoration services in the face of climate change and other environmental challenges.
