= Virtual tour =

Simulation of an existing location

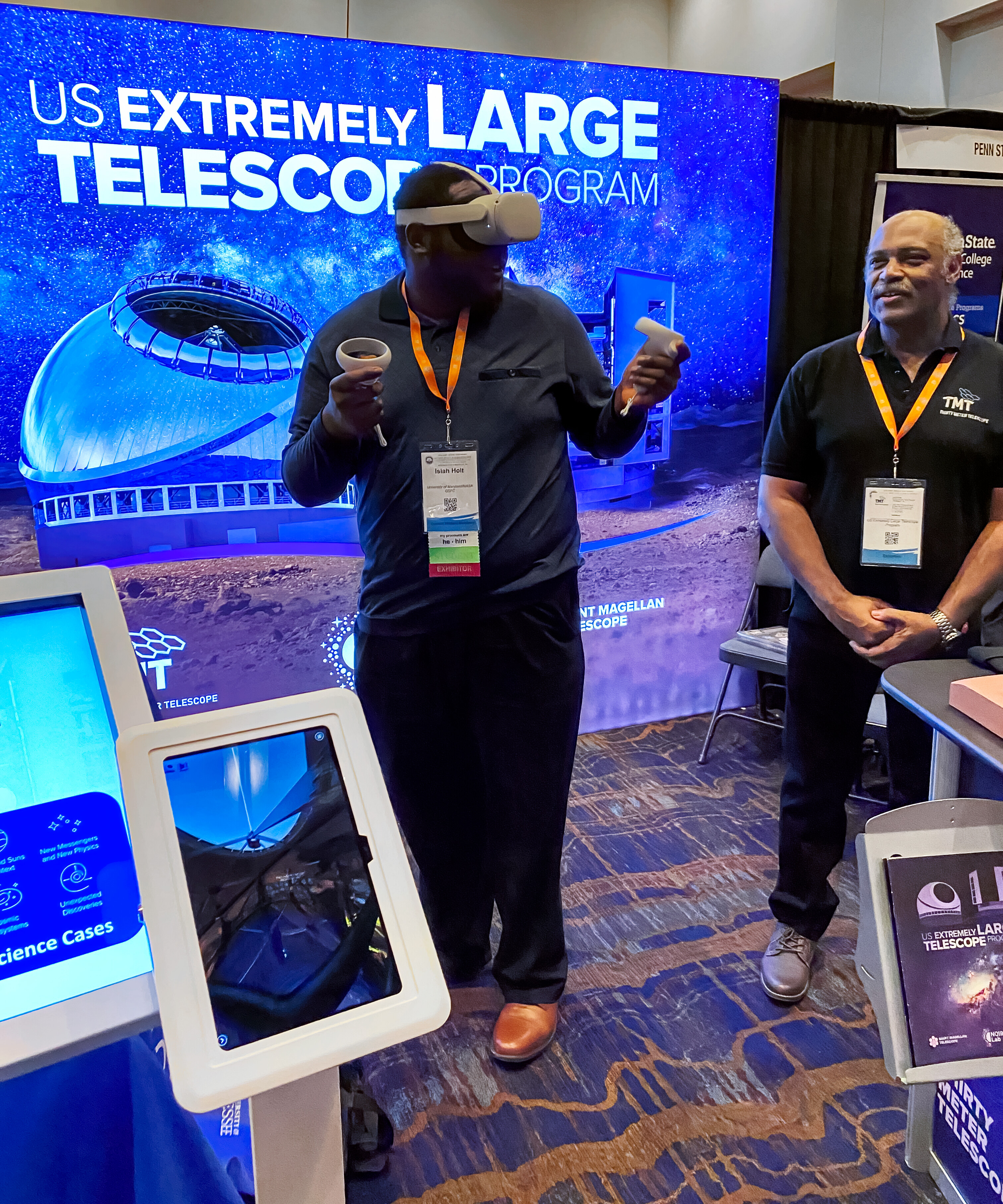
virtual tour at the NSBP Conference

A virtual tour is a simulation of an existing location, usually composed of a sequence of videos, still images or 360-degree images. It may also use other multimedia elements such as sound effects, music, narration, text and floor map.

The phrase "virtual tour" is often used to describe a variety of videos and photographic-based media. Panorama indicates an unbroken view, since a panorama can be either a series of photographs or panning video footage. However, the phrases "panoramic tour" and "virtual tour" have mostly been associated with virtual tours created using still cameras. Such virtual tours are made up of a number of shots taken from a single vantage point. The camera and lens are rotated around what is known as a no parallax point (the exact point at the back of the lens where the light converges).

A video tour is a full motion video of a location. Unlike the virtual tour's static wrap-around feel, a video tour is a linear walk-through of a location. Using a video camera, the location is filmed at a walking pace while moving continuously from one point to another throughout the subject location. 3D virtual tours can be created using 3D reconstruction.

== History ==
The origin of the term 'virtual tour' dates to 1994. The first example of a virtual tour was a museum visitor interpretive tour, consisting of 'walk-through' of a 3D reconstruction of Dudley Castle in England as it was in 1550. This consisted of a computer-controlled laser disc based system designed by British-based engineer Colin Johnson.

One of the first users of a virtual tour was Queen Elizabeth II, when she officially opened the visitor center in June 1994. Because the Queen's officials had requested titles, descriptions and instructions of all activities, the system was named and described as: "Virtual Tour, being a cross between Virtual Reality and Royal Tour."

== Capture ==
Virtual tours can be captured using omnidirectional cameras and/or with image stitching.

== Video-based ==
With the expansion of video on the internet, video-based virtual tours are growing in popularity. Video cameras are used to pan and walk-through real subject properties. The benefit of this method is that the point of view is constantly changing throughout a pan. However, capturing high-quality video requires significantly more technical skill and equipment than taking digital still pictures. Video also eliminates viewer control of the tour. Therefore, the tour is the same for all viewers and subject is chosen by the videographer. Editing digital video requires proficiency with video editing software and has higher computer hardware requirements. Also, displaying video over the internet requires more bandwidth. Due to these difficulties, the task of creating video-based tours is often left to professionals.

== Applications ==
Virtual tours are used extensively for universities, sport venues, real estate and hospitality industries, among other things. Virtual tours can allow a user to view an environment without needing to be present physically. Currently, a variety of industries use such technology to help market their services and product. Over the last few years, the quality and accessibility of virtual tours have improved considerably, with some websites allowing the user to navigate the tours by clicking on maps or integrated floor plans.

=== Web-based or online ===
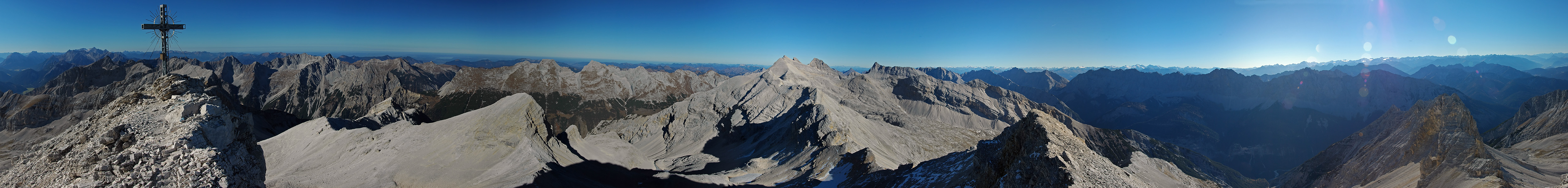
Example of a photo used in a virtual tour, mouseover annotations with links to mountains and valleys around

For most business purposes, a virtual tour must be accessible from everywhere. The major solution is a web-based virtual tour. In addition, a rich and useful virtual tour is not just a series of panoramic pictures. A better experience can be obtained by viewing a variety of materials such as that obtained from videos, texts, and still pictures in an interactive web content. There are many ways to gather data in a mixed web content, such as using rich content builders or a Web content management system.

A study done by the PEW Research Group showed that more than 5 million Americans watched virtual tours every day in 2004. PEW's research data, which showed that Americans watching virtual tours rose from 54 million people in 2004 to 72 million people by August 2006, a two-year increase of 18 million.

=== Real estate ===
Virtual tours are very popular in the real estate industry. Several types of such tours exist, including simple options such as interactive floor plans, and more sophisticated options such as full-service virtual tours. An interactive floor plan shows photographs of a property with the aid of a floor plan and arrows to indicate where each photograph was taken. Clicking on arrows shows the user where the camera was and which way the camera was pointing. Full service virtual tours are usually created by a professional photographer who will visit the property being sold, take several photos, and run them through stitching software. Full service virtual tours are usually more expensive than interactive floor plans because of the expense of the photographer, higher-end equipment used, such as a digital SLR camera, and specialized software. Real estate virtual tours are typically linked to the listing in the Multiple Listing Service.

=== Historic preservation ===
3D virtual tour technology has been increasingly used in the documentation and preservation of historic properties that are at risk of being razed or undergoing restricted public access. 3D virtual models using standard file formats, such as the Object file (.obj) format, can be stored in digital archives for future academic research and exploration.

=== Hospitality ===
Virtual tours are also popular in the hospitality industry. Hotels are increasingly offering online tours on their websites, ranging from "360" stitched photos to professionally produced video tours. These tours are typically offered by hotels in an effort to increase booking revenue by providing online viewers with an immersive view of the property and its amenities.

=== Virtual walks ===
Virtual walk videos are documentary motion pictures shot as the camera continuously moves forward through an urban or natural area. The effect is to allow viewers to experience the sights they would see and the sounds they would hear were they actually traveling along a particular route at the same pace as the camera. Virtual walks based on real-world photography typically do not require the use of virtual reality goggles or headsets of the kind used by gamers.

In realistically simulating the experience of moving through space, virtual walks—or virtual runs or bicycle rides—differ from conventional travel videos, which typically consist of a sequence of mostly static camera setups along a particular route or within a given area. The advantage of the conventional travel video is that one or more narrators or on-screen guides can provide insights into the geographical, historical, political, military, cultural, geological, or architectural aspects of the area.

Virtual walks appeal to those who want to experience the sights and sounds of particular places in the country or the world, but who may not have the time or the financial or physical resources to actually travel there. They also appeal to treadmill or elliptical trainer users, for whom walking or running while watching these videos enhances the reality of the experience (and, at a minimum, reduce the boredom of the exercise).

Some feature-length narrative motion pictures have made use of the virtual walk technique for dramatic purposes. These include the opening sequences of Orson Welles’ Touch of Evil and Robert Altman's The Player, the famous tracking shot through the Copacabana in Martin Scorsese's Goodfellas, Alexander Sokurov's Russian Ark (which consists of a single 96-minute Steadicam take), and, more recently Alfonso Cuarón's long tracking shots in Gravity, and almost the entire narrative structure of Alejandro Gonzáles Iñárrito's Birdman.

=== Three-dimensional virtual tourism ===
3D virtual tourism is the realistic 3D geo-visualisation of virtual environments, which allows the user to explore physical places without physical travel. 3DVT typically creates a virtual tour that uses 3D models and 2D panoramic images, a sequence of hyperlinked still or video images, and image-based models of the real world, with additional elements such as sound effects, music, narration, and text. As opposed to actual tourism, 3DVT is accessed on a smartphone or computer (typically over the Internet). It aims to evoke an experience of moving through the real place without actual travel.

Virtual tours can be especially useful for universities and real-estate operators who want to attract students, tenants, and buyers, while eliminating the cost of travel to numerous locations. For these applications, 3DVT can be designed and constructed from 3D interactive mapping technologies, such as Google Earth or Virtual Earth or X3D Earth.

Virtual tours allow tourists to explore destinations before they visit, and some flexible tours allow visitors to book accommodations.

=== Manufacturing ===
Virtual tours are increasingly being used in manufacturing environments to provide remote access to factory facilities without the need for physical visits. These tours are particularly valuable in industries where safety, cleanliness, or confidentiality are critical.

== See also ==
- Travel technology applications
- VRML
- VR Photography
- 3D Floor Plan
- 3D computer graphics software
- Google Expeditions
- Virtual environment software
