= Floor plan =

Architectural drawing showing interior layout of a building

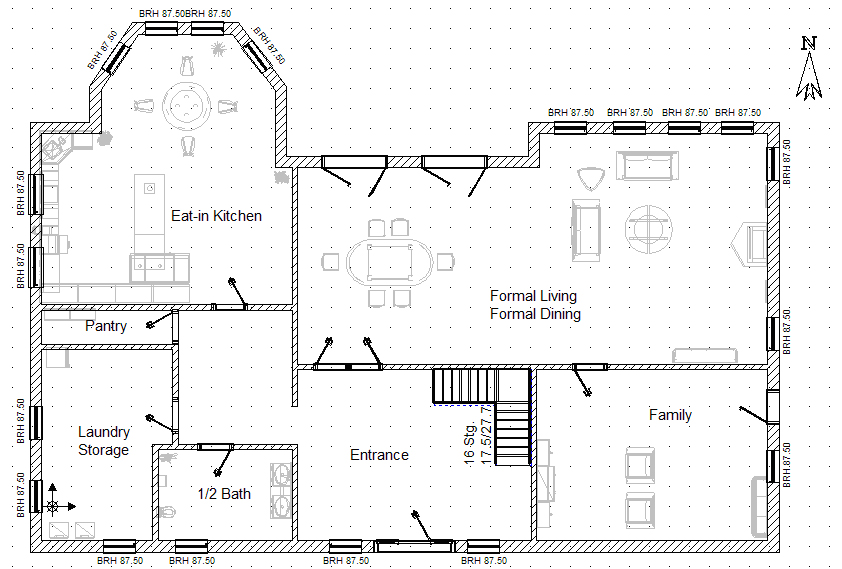
First floor plan of a single-family house showing a north arrow, room tags, furniture layouts, window and door placement, relative wall thicknesses, and window specification details.

In architecture and building engineering, a floor plan is a technical or diagrammatic drawing that illustrates the horizontal relationships of interior spaces or features to one another at one level of a structure. They are typically drawn to-scale and in orthographic projection to represent relationships without distortion. They are usually drawn approximately 4 ft (1.2 m) above the finished floor and indicate the direction of north.

The level of detail included on a floor plan is directly tied to its intended use and phase of design. For instance, a plan produced in the schematic design phase may show only major divisions of space and approximate square footages while one produced for construction may indicate the construction types of various walls. Floor plans may indicate specific dimensions or square footages for particular rooms and/or walls. They may also include details of fixtures (sinks, water heaters, furnaces, etc), notes to specify finishes, construction methods, or symbols for electrical items. They may be rendered or drafted.

== Overview ==
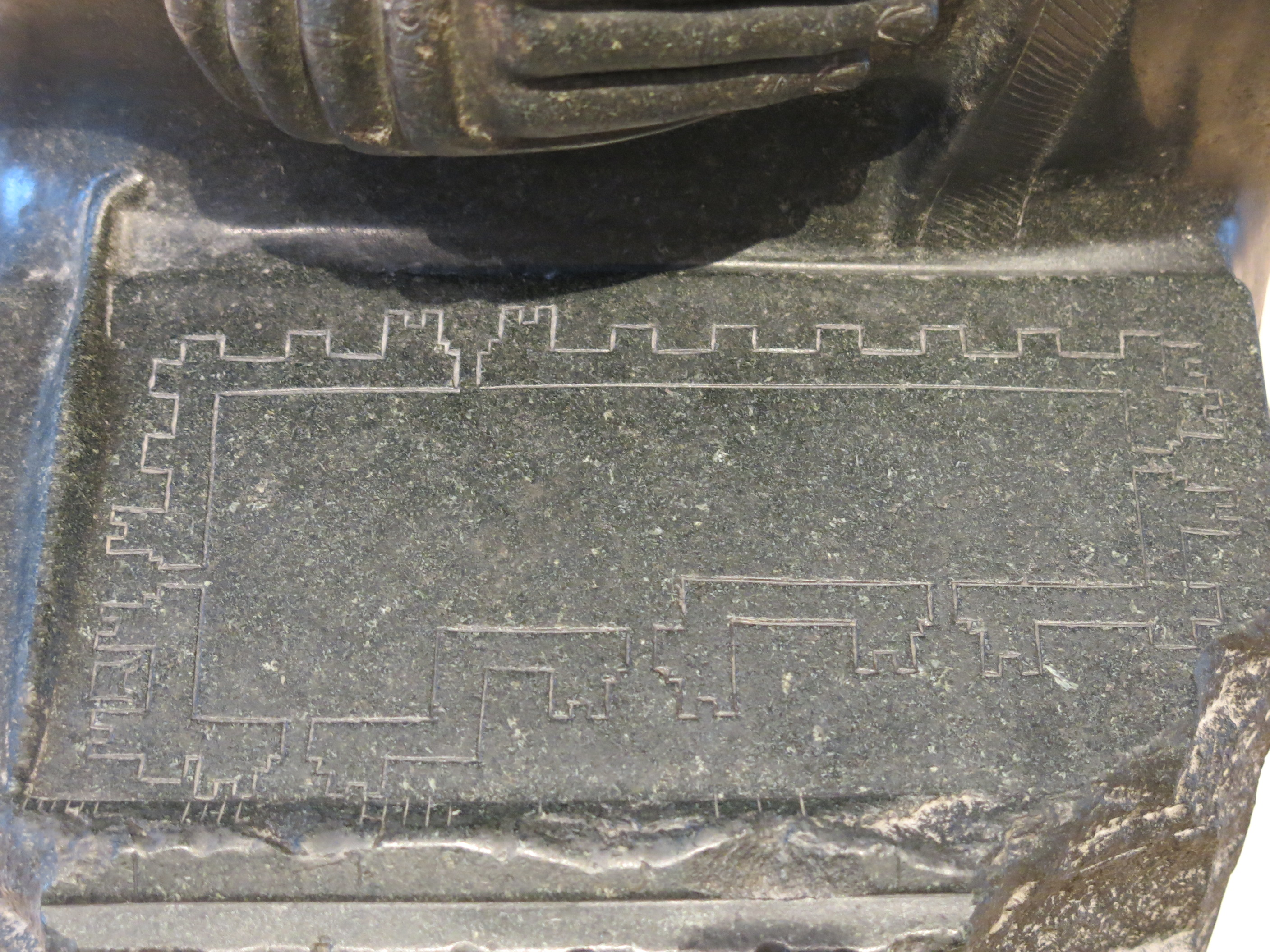
A floor plan of a temple, carved on a statue of Gudea, 22nd century BC showing the exterior wall.

Similar to a map, the orientation of the view is downward from above, but unlike a conventional map, a plan is drawn at a particular vertical position (commonly at about four feet above the floor). Objects below this level are seen, objects at this level are shown 'cut' in plan-section, and objects above this vertical position within the structure are omitted or shown dashed. Plan view or planform is defined as a vertical orthographic projection of an object on a horizontal plane, like a map.

The term may be used in general to describe any drawing showing the physical layout of objects. For example, it may denote the arrangement of the displayed objects at an exhibition, or the arrangement of exhibitor booths at a convention. Drawings are now reproduced using plotters and large format xerographic copiers.

The art of constructing ground plans (ichnography; Gr. τὸ ἴχνος, íchnos, "track, trace" and γράφειν, gráphein, "to write"; pronounced ik-nog-rəfi) was first described by Vitruvius (i.2) and included the geometrical projection or horizontal section representing the plan of any building, taken at such a level as to show the outer walls, with the doorways, windows, fireplaces, etc., and the correct thickness of the walls; the position of piers, columns or pilasters, courtyards and other features which constitute the design, as to scale.

=== Plan view ===
A plan view is an orthographic projection of a three-dimensional object from the position of a horizontal plane through the object. In other words, a plan is a section viewed from the top. In such views, the portion of the object above the plane (section) is omitted to reveal what lies beyond. In the case of a floor plan, the roof and upper portion of the walls may typically be omitted. Whenever an interior design project is being approached, a floor plan is the typical starting point for any further design considerations and decisions.

Roof plans are orthographic projections, but they are not sections as their viewing plane is outside of the object.

A plan is a common method of depicting the internal arrangement of a three-dimensional object in two dimensions. It is often used in technical drawing and is traditionally crosshatched. The style of crosshatching indicates the type of material the section passes through.

== Variations ==
=== Reflected ceiling plan ===
A reflected ceiling plan (RCP) shows a view of the room as if looking from above, through the ceiling, at a mirror installed one foot below the ceiling level, which shows the reflected image of the ceiling above. This convention maintains the same orientation of the floor and ceilings plans – looking down from above. RCPs are used by designers and architects to demonstrate lighting, visible mechanical features, and ceiling forms as part of the documents provided for construction.

=== 3D floor plans ===
A 3D floor plan is a perspectival, rather than orthographic, representation of a plan. They are usually produced using a digital model of a building floor plan and rendered. They are often used to convey architectural plans to individuals not familiar with floor plans. Despite the purpose of floor plans originally being to depict 3D layouts in a 2D manner, technological expansion has made rendering 3D models much more cost effective. 3D plans show a better depth of image and are often complemented by 3D furniture in the room. This allows a greater appreciation of scale than with traditional 2D floor plans.

=== Plan diagrams ===
Simplified plan views may be used to indicate various non-technical information such as the location of fire exits, interior circulation patterns, programmatic arrangements, or solid/void relationships. These are primarily used in the design process or as presentation (rather than construction) drawings.

== See also ==
- 3D printing
- 3D scanner
- Architect's scale
- Architectural drawing
- List of floor plan software
- House
- House plan
- Indoor positioning system (IPS)
- Room number
- magicplan
