= Live Home 3D =

Virtual home designing software

- Developer: Belight Software
- Release: 4 April 2007
- Operating system: macOS, Windows 10, iOS
- Available in: 9 languages
- Type: Virtual home design software
- Website: www.livehome3d.com

Live Home 3D is a virtual home design software application for macOS, Windows 10 computers and iOS. The software enables users to create and visualize floor plans and interior layouts in both 2D and 3D. The software supports high-resolution renderings, animated walkthroughs, and panoramic views.
