= 3D floor plan =

Virtual model of a building floor plan

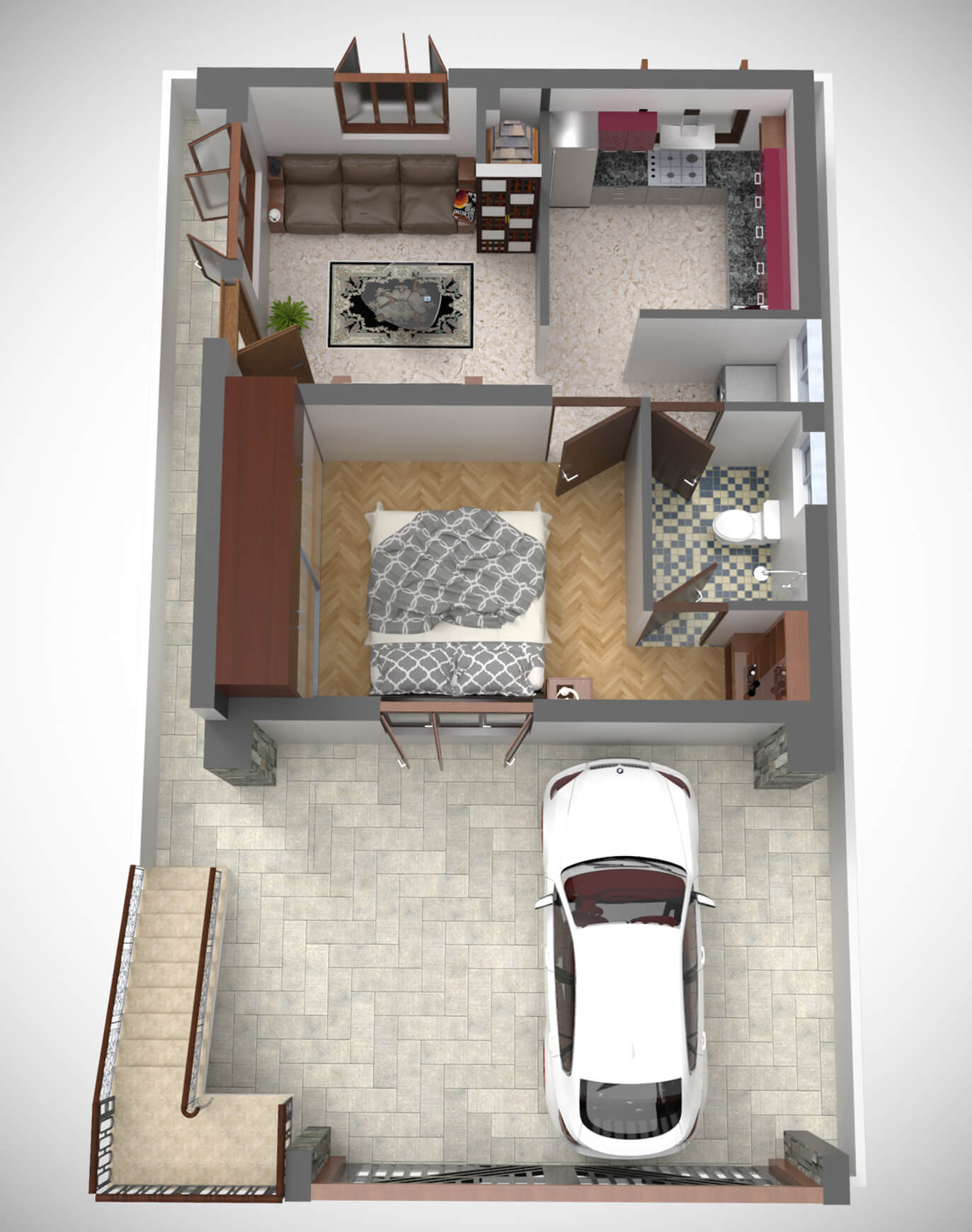

A 3D floor plan, or 3D floorplan, is a virtual model of a building floor plan, depicted from a birds eye view, utilized within the building industry to better convey architectural plans. Usually built to scale, a 3D floor plan must include walls and a floor and typically includes exterior wall fenestrations, windows, and doorways. It does not include a ceiling so as not to obstruct the view. Other common attributes may be added, but are not required, such as cabinets, flooring, bathroom fixtures, paint color, wall tile, and other interior finishes. Furniture may be added to assist in communicating proper home staging and interior design.

== Purpose ==
3D floor plans assist real estate marketers and architects in explaining floor plans to clients. Their simplicity allows individuals unfamiliar with conventional floor plans to understand difficult architectural concepts. This allows architects and homeowners to literally see design elements prior to construction and alter design elements during the design phase. 3D floorplans are often commissioned by architects, builders, hotels, universities, real estate agents, and property owners to assist in relating their floor plans to clients.

== Construction ==
A 3D floor plan is built utilizing 3D rendering software, the same type of software used to create major animated motion pictures. Through complex lighting, staging, camera, and rendering techniques 3D floor plans appear to be real photographs rather than digital representations of the buildings after which they are modeled. It is also the presentation of building floor-plan in an advanced manner, bringing it to real life views.

== Technology ==
WebGL allows many companies to provide their users with unique 3D experiences right in their web browser. In addition, since 2014, WebVR helps make Virtual Reality experiences accessible to wider audiences. 3D floor plans can now be visited via Google Cardboard or various VR headsets. Due to the increasing popularity of VR content, many real estate professionals (real estate firms, developers, online platforms) are turning to 3D models of spaces to improve their marketing efforts.

== See also ==
- Floor plan
- Plan (drawing)
- 3D rendering
- Virtual tour
- Home staging
- Computer-aided design (CAD)
- WebVR
- WebGL
- magicplan
