= Magicplan =

Mobile application for augmented reality- based floor plans

magicplan
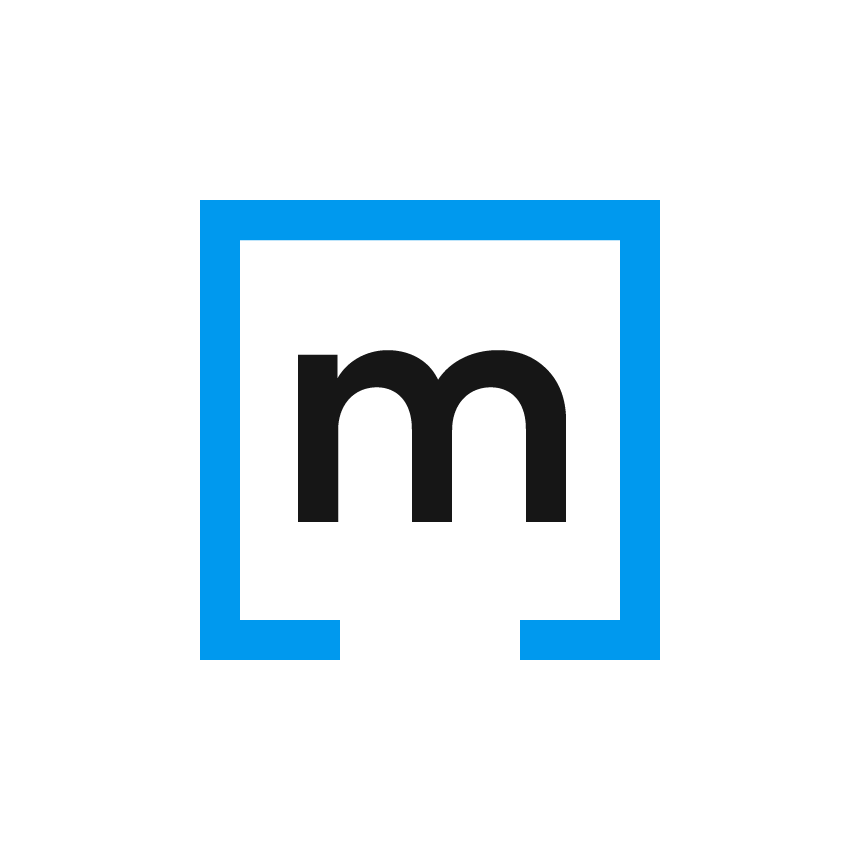
- Developer: Sensopia Inc.
- Operating system: iOS, Android, Web (Cloud)
- Available in: English, German, French, Spanish, Portuguese
- Type: CAD, AR
- License: Proprietary
- Website: www.magicplan.app

magicplan is a mobile application developed by Sensopia Inc. that allows users to create 2D and 3D floor plans, capture field documentation, and produce scopes, reports and estimates using smartphone or tablet alongside artificial intelligence.

The app is used in industries such as restoration, insurance, inspection, construction, real estate, and facilities management for space measurement, documentation, scoping and cost estimation. Magicplan is available on iOS and Android devices.

== History ==
Magicplan was founded and developed by Pierre Pontevia and Pierre Gaubil in 2011, via their software firm, Sensopia Inc., in Montreal, Canada. The firm expanded to San Francisco the following year. In 2016, Sensopia merged with B&O, a German company conglomerate in the housing sector. Since then, magicplan holds offices in Montreal and Munich. The first version of magicplan was launched in 2011 for iOS devices, and the Android version followed in 2013. The app gained widespread recognition and dozens of millions of users and was included in Apple's 2012 and 2017 Best Apps of the Year list.

== Features ==
magicplan combines artificial intelligence and AR technology, through Apple's ARKit with deep learning. Users can capture room dimensions, add objects such as furniture and appliances, and annotate the plan with additional information.

The app includes various features, including:

- 2D and 3D floor plan generation
- Automatic room and objects detection and measurement
- Object library with customizable items
- Integration with other cloud storage services
- Exporting in multiple file formats (e.g., ESX, FML, PDF, JPG, DXF, OBJ, IFC and CSV)
- Field reports including photos, 360° images, notes, custom forms, and markups
- Scopes of work with line items
- Take-off and work estimates to calculate pricing
- Collaboration tools for sharing and editing floor plans in real time
- Integrations with Xactimate from Verisk and Cotality

== Applications ==
magicplan is used across a range of industries for space planning, documentation, and estimation tasks. Common uses include:

- Restoration (water damage, fire damage, mold remediation and CAT)
- Claims adjustment and damage assessment
- Home inspection reporting
- Construction, remodeling, renovation, and DIY project estimating
- Real estate marketing and property listings
- Architectural and interior design planning
- Facility and asset management
