= Recession-proof job =

Job that could be found during economic hardship

A recession-proof job is a job that one is likely to be able to find even during hard economic times. Though these jobs are not truly "recession-proof," they have a continual demand for workers, thereby increasing the chances that one who has the skills will be likely to find employment.

What makes a job so-called recession-proof is society's perpetual need and heavy demand for the service related jobs. Certain fields, such as health care, education, law enforcement, and various computer-related occupations are thereby always in demand. But as to which specific jobs are the most recession-proof, this varies in different eras, as the times change, and each recession differs. Also, the geographic locality may make a difference.

When a recession occurs, many people, especially those who have lost their jobs, those whose jobs have been threatened, or those who fear losing their jobs are motivated to seek education to be able to obtain recession-proof employment in their future.
