= Renovation =

Improving a broken, damaged or outdated structure

Renovation (also called remodeling) is the process of improving broken, damaged, or outdated structures. Renovations are typically done on either commercial or residential buildings. Additionally, renovation can refer to making something new, or bringing something back to life and can apply in social contexts. For example, a community can be renovated if it is strengthened and revived. It can also be restoring something to a former better state (as by cleaning, repairing, or rebuilding). Renovation is a widespread practice in many regions, often driven by safety upgrades, energy efficiency improvements, and aesthetic preferences. For example, there are more than twenty thousand home improvement projects every year in Hong Kong, affecting more than a million residents (population of HK is around 7.5 million in 2023).

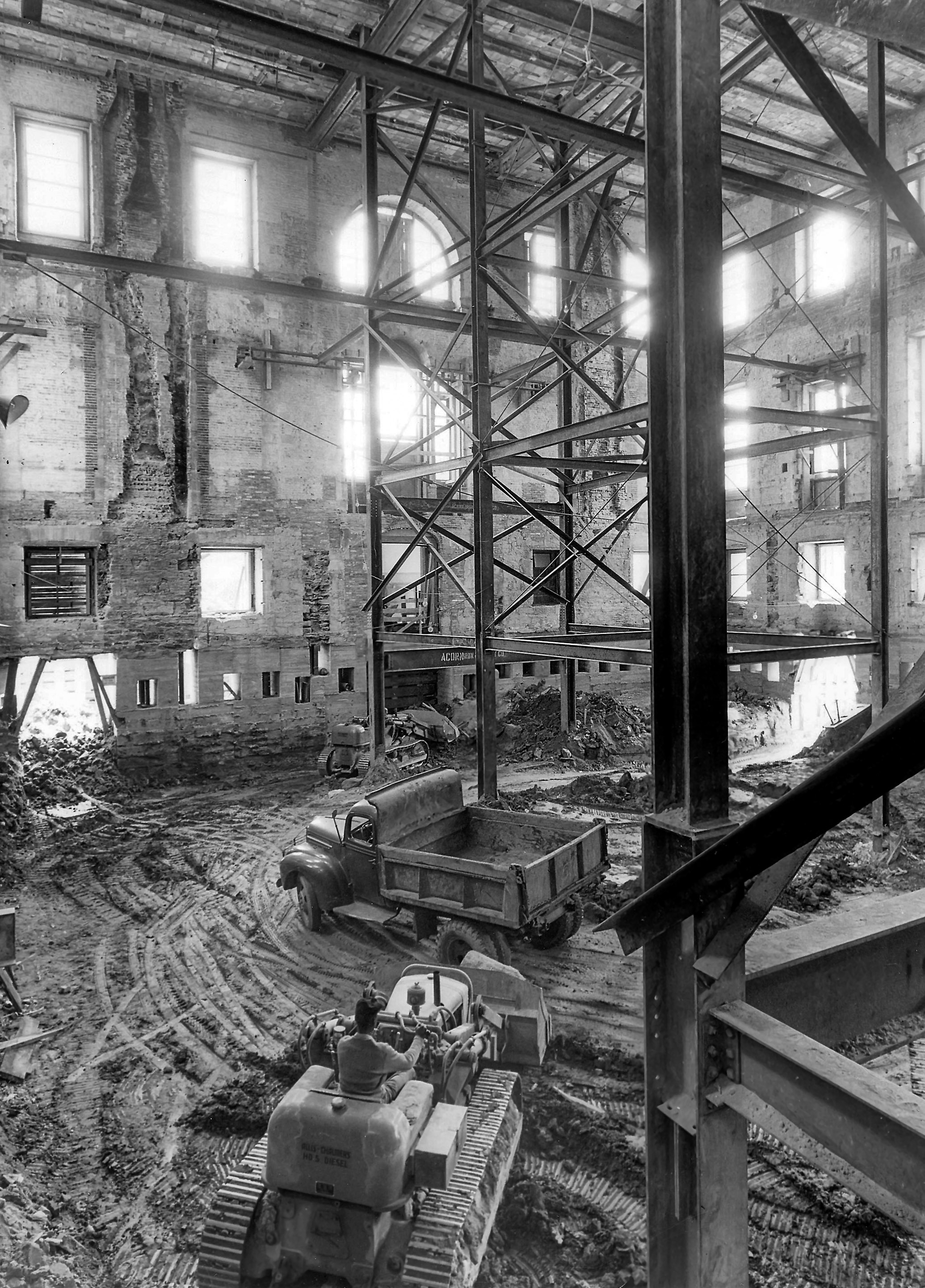
Harry Truman's renovation of the White House, 17 May 1950

== Phases and process of renovations ==
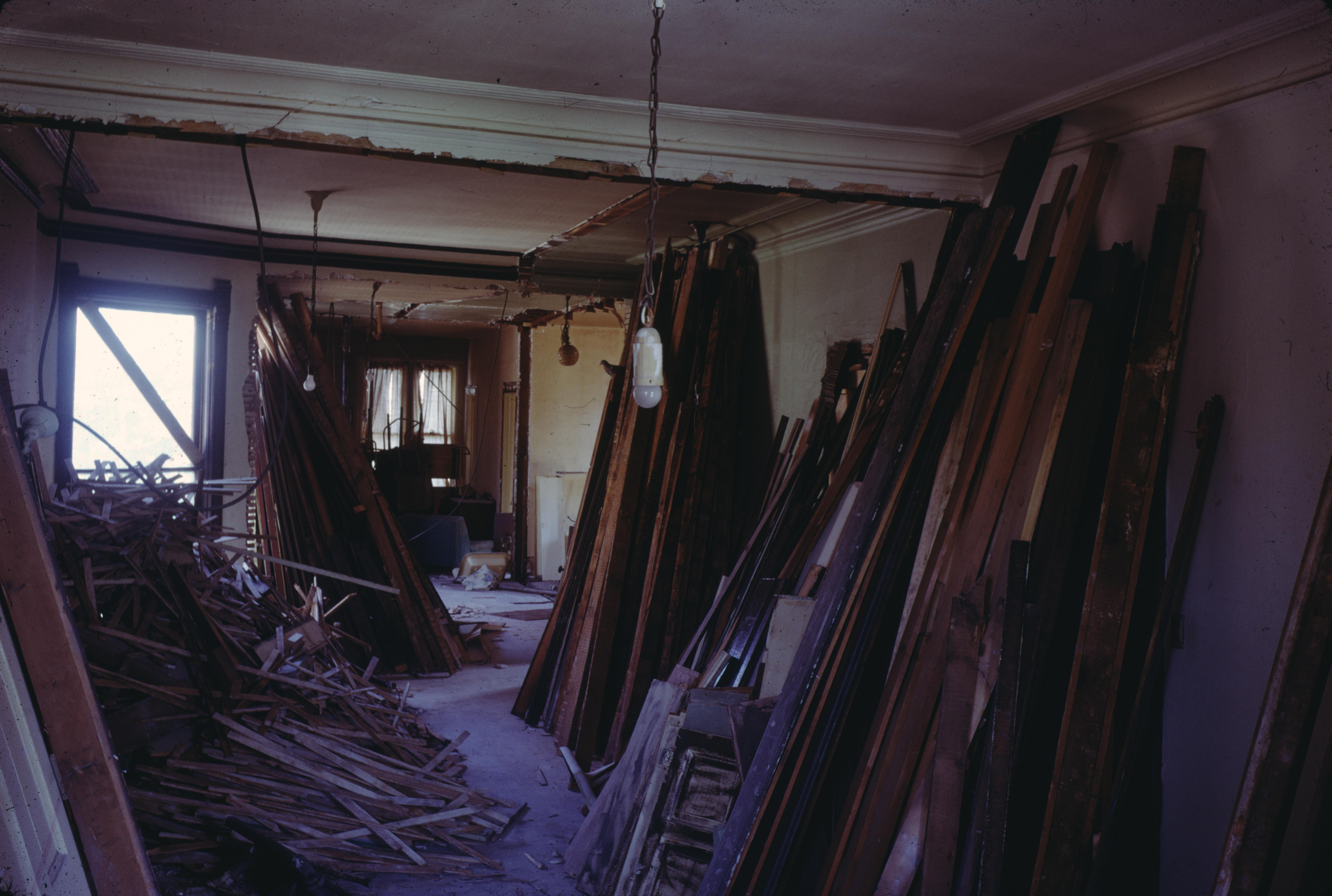
The interior of a Victorian building in Lincoln Park, Chicago in the process of being renovated in June 1971. Note the elements of the edifice scattered and sorted about.

The building renovation process can usually, depending on the extents of the renovation, be broken down into several phases. The phases are as follow.

- Project initiation - The beginning of the project that includes the hiring of construction and design teams, defining the scope of the work, creating a budget, and communicating the needs, expectations, and wants from both the client and building team
- Existing conditions analysis - This includes measuring, drawing, and analyzing the structure to be renovated, and identifying any major issues with the project that could effect work to be done
- Initial design - Beginning the design work by testing out concept ideas, designing multiple iterations of outcomes, communicating with the client, and receiving client feedback on the design to make changes
- Finalizing design - Finalizing the design work by making sure the design is what the client wants, making sure the design works with existing conditions, creating a more detailed design (including specs and engineering), also could include the beginning of construction or demolition work while the design is being finalized
- Construction and demolition - Starting the physical work by completing demolition needed, structural repairs needed, building new designed conditions, applying finishes, and trouble shooting any problems or unknown conditions that are brought to light during construction
- Project finalization - The end of the project which includes turnover to the client, punch listing, walking through with the client, and verifying that project scope and expectations were met

Projects involving renovation require not just flexibility, but a plan that had been agreed upon by multiple parties. The planning process will involve feedback from financial investors of the project, and from the designer. Part of planning will also entail the collection of data for the completion of the project and then the project plan will be revised and given consent before continuing with renovations.

Technology has had a meaningful effect on the renovation process, increasing the significance and strength of the planning stage. The availability of free online design tools has improved visualization of the changes, at a fraction of the cost of hiring a professional designer. The decision regarding changes is also influenced by the purpose of renovation. Depending on the significance of these changes a professional may be required, especially if any changes other than cosmetic work (paint or finishes) is required. Many local codes require a professional to complete work in the built environment such as structural changes, new walls, new plumbing, or many others. Doing these changes without hiring a professional can result in health effects, safety concerns, damages, fines, and increased cost due to having to hire a professional after self-work. Most builders focus on building new homes, so renovating is typically a part-time activity for such tradespeople. The processes and services required for renovations are quite specific and, once plans are signed off, building a new home is relatively predictable. However, during renovation projects, flexibility is often required from renovation companies to respond to unexpected issues that arise. Renovations usually require all of the sub-trades that are needed for the construction of a new building.

In case of a so-called "fix-and-flip" (repair and resell) objective, an ROI (return on investment) can result from changes to fix a structural issue, to fix design flow yield, or to use light and color to make rooms appear more spacious. Because interior renovation could change of the internal structure of the house, ceiling construction, circuit configuration and partition walls, etc., such work related to the structure of the house, of course, also includes renovation of wallpaper posting, furniture settings, lighting, etc. oftentimes an interior designer is required as well.

== Reasons to renovate ==
=== Homes ===
Many cities and towns have been renovated because of the devastations, such as Rovaniemi in Lapland, Finland. Video about the post-war era reconstruction of Rovaniemi in 1949.

Many people renovate homes to create a new appearance. Builders may renovate homes to enhance the home's value as a stable source of income. Homeowners often renovate their homes to increase the re-sale value and to turn a profit when selling. Homeowners may also want to add renovations that make their home more energy efficient, green or sustainable. Also, over time, a homeowner's personal preferences and needs may change, and the home will be renovated for improved aesthetics, comfort, or functionality.

=== Other properties ===
Other types of renovations also can be initiated for similar reasons. The user or owner of a building can change which can effect the needs or wants for the space prompting a renovation. This is becoming more popular as buildings owners are renting or leasing floors or sections of the buildings to companies which have different spacial requirements than the previous users causing needed renovation. Renovations can also occur as companies increase size which could lead to needed additional retail, office, or other types of spaces. Similarly to homes other building owners could also want renovations to increased value, make the building more energy efficient, green or sustainable, or to update the building. Sometimes shopping centres or shops are renovated to raise rent later.

== Materials ==
=== Wood ===
Wood is considered a versatile and adaptable construction material, often preferred in renovations due to its ease of modification and availability. Few homeowners or professional remodelers possess the skill and equipment that is required to alter steel-frame or concrete structures.

When looking at embodied carbon in building materials wood is often labeled as the most sustainable. This is because it sequesters carbon which if certified sustainably sourced will significantly reduce embodied carbon of buildings. This makes it a low emitting choice for a building material for an overall building and for renovations.

Forest certification verifies that wood products have been sourced from well-managed forests. Most certification programs provide online search options so that consumers can find certified products—the Certification Canada program includes a search option for all of the certification programs that are in use in Canada.

In North America, most structures are demolished because of external forces such as zoning changes and rising land values. Additionally, buildings that cannot be modified to serve the functional needs of the occupants are subject to demolition. Very few buildings on the continent are demolished due to structural degradation.

The Athena Institute surveyed 227 commercial and residential buildings that were demolished in St. Paul, Minnesota, between 2000 and mid-2003. Thirty percent of the buildings were less than 50 years old, and 6% were less than 25 years old. The four top reasons for demolition were "area redevelopment" (35%), "building's physical condition" (31%), "not suitable for anticipated use" (22%), and "fire damage" (7%). Lack of maintenance was cited as the specific problem for 54 of the 70 buildings where physical condition was given as the reason for demolition.

=== Plastics ===
Plastics are extensively used in the construction and renovation industry. Airborne microplastic dust is produced during renovation, building, bridge and road reconstruction projects and the use of power tools. It is also generated by deterioration of building materials

Materials containing polyvinyl chloride (PVC), polycarbonate, polypropylene, and acrylic, can degrade overtime releasing microplastics. During the construction process, single use plastic containers and wrappers are discarded adding to plastic waste. These plastics are difficult to recycle and end up in landfills where they break down over a long period of time causing potential leaching into the soil and the release of airborne microplastics. Efforts have been made to reduce plastic waste by adding it to concrete as agglomerates. However, one solution for resolving the problem from the large amount of plastic wastes generated could bring another serious problem of leaching of microplastics. The unknown part of this area is huge and needs prompt investigation.

The construction industry is one of the largest consumers of plastic materials, utilizing approximately 20% of all plastics produced annually. It also accounts for around 70% of global polyvinyl chloride (PVC) consumption, primarily in applications such as piping, window frames, flooring, and insulation. It is predicted that much more will be produced and used in the future. "In Europe, approximately 20% of all plastics produced are used in the construction sector including different classes of plastics, waste and nanomaterials."

=== Others ===
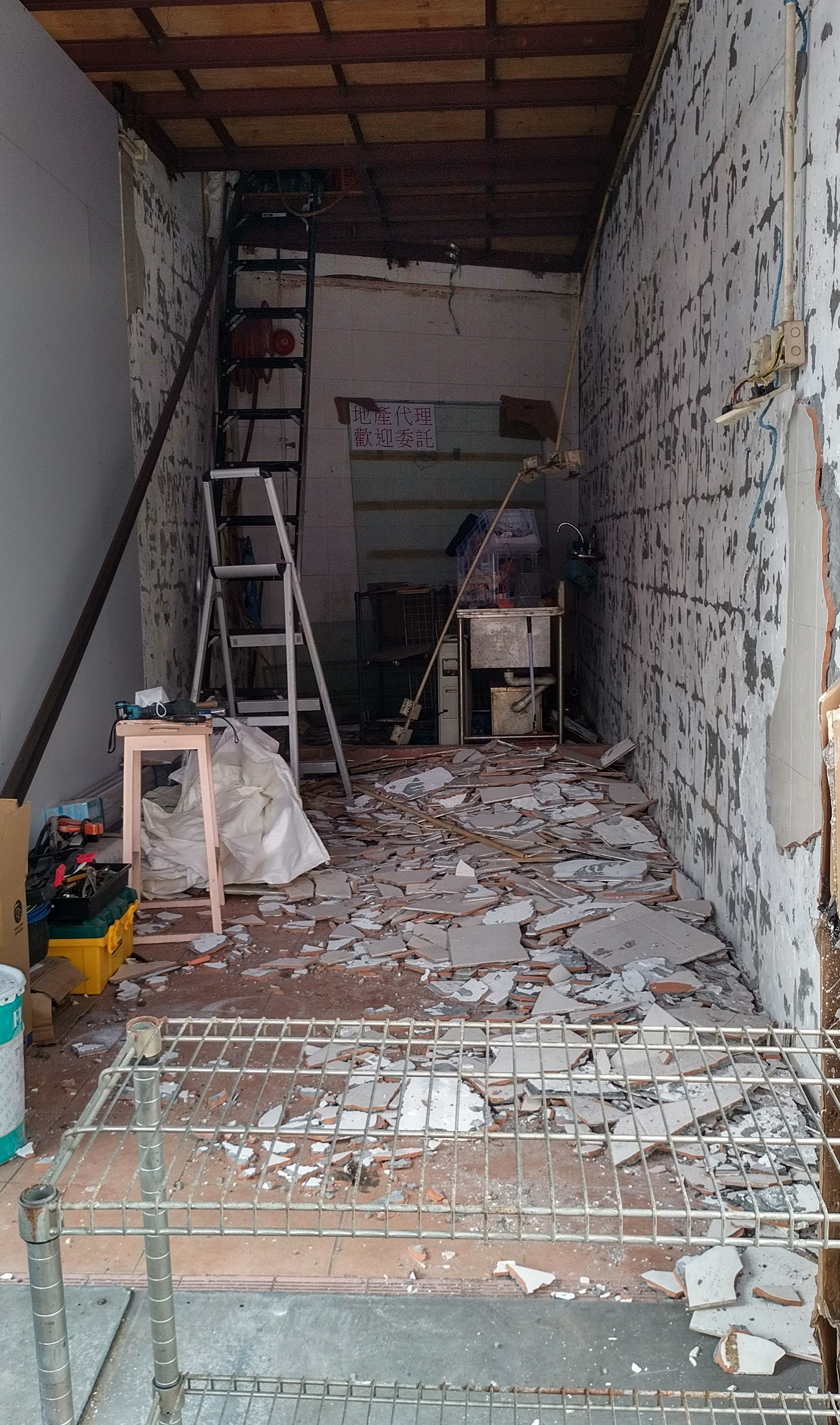
A shop under renovation, Hong Kong. The type of dust generated depends on the material being worked on. For example, in the above photo the dust does not seem to be solely wood dust, concrete dust, metal dust or paint dust.

- Adhesive
- Asbestos
- Asbestos#Substitutes for asbestos in construction
- Cement
- Concrete
- Glass
- Lead paint
- Metals
- Paint
- Plasterboard
- Solvent

== Tools and equipment ==
While the type of material used will determine the composition of the dust generated, the size and amount of particulates produced are mainly determined by the type of tool used. Implementation of effective dust control measures may also play a role.

Video: An angle grinder is used for cutting through a steel chain. The chain is kept under tension by a second person to avoid a blockade of the grinder. Large amounts of potentially harmful particulates (metal dust) are being generated.)

Use of angle grinder is not preferred as large amounts of harmful sparks and fumes (and particulates) are generated when compared with using reciprocating saw or band saw. Angle grinders produce sparks when cutting ferrous metals. They also produce shards cutting other materials. The blades themselves may also break. This is a great hazard to the face and eyes especially, as well as other parts of the body.

=== Adverse effects of power tool use ===
Use of power tools can cause adverse effects on people living nearby. Power tools can produce large amounts of particulates including ultrafine particles.

Particulates are the most harmful form (other than ultra-fines) of air pollution There is no safe level of particulates.

Many tasks create dust. High dust levels are caused by one of more the following:

A high dust level example.

- equipment – using high energy tools, such as cut-off saws, grinders, wall chasers and grit blasters produce a lot of dust in a very short time
- work method – dry sweeping can make a lot of dust when compared to vacuuming or wet brushing
- work area – the more enclosed a space, the more the dust will build up
- time – the longer you work the more dust there will be

Examples of high dust level tasks include:

- using power tools to cut, grind, drill or prepare a surface
- sanding taped plaster board joints
- dry sweeping

Some power tools are equipped with dust collection system (e.g. HEPA vacuum cleaner) or integrated water delivery system which extract the dust after emission.

== Effects ==
=== Air quality ===
==== Indoor ====
- Construction dust
- Fumes
- Solvents / paint thinners / dours

==== Outdoor ====
- Pollutants escaped from air outlet
- From (not properly covered) construction waste

=== Health ===
Shops under renovation

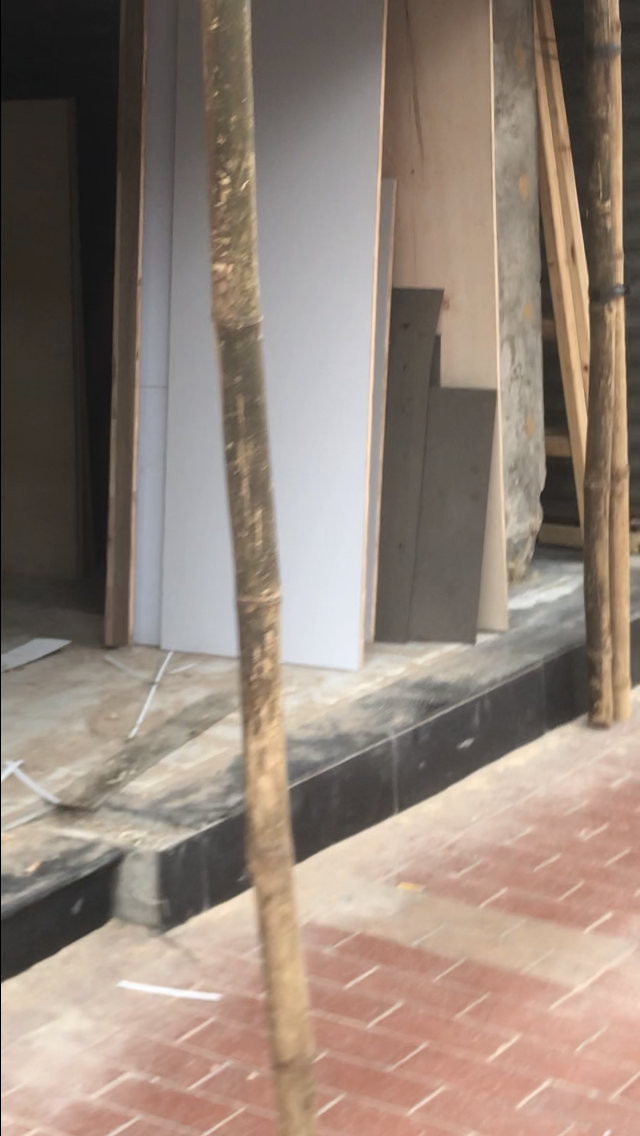

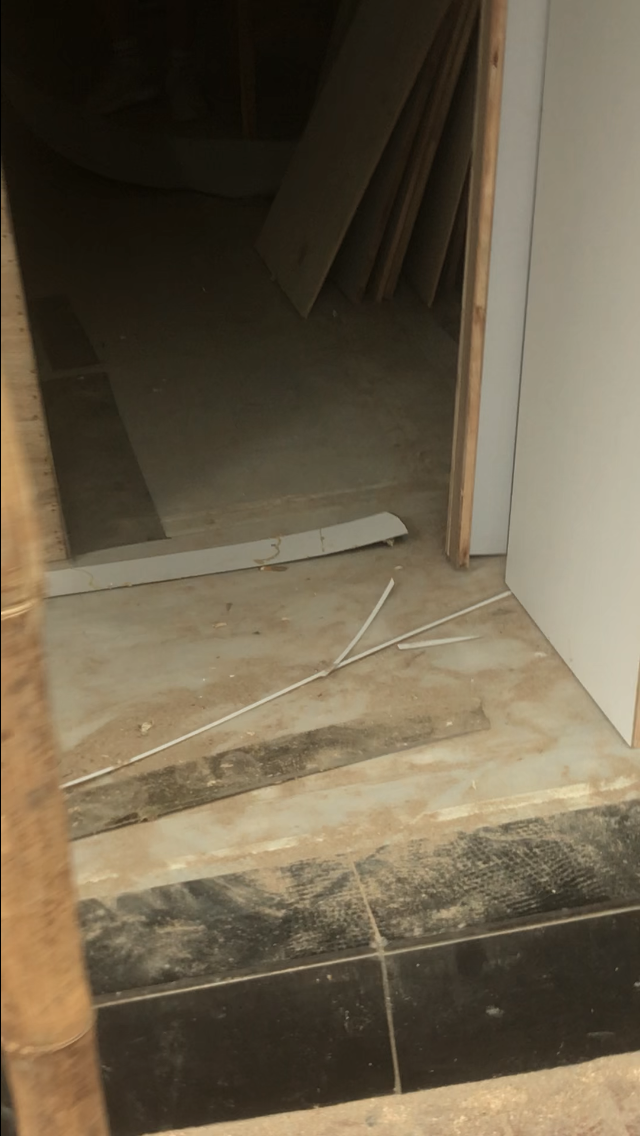

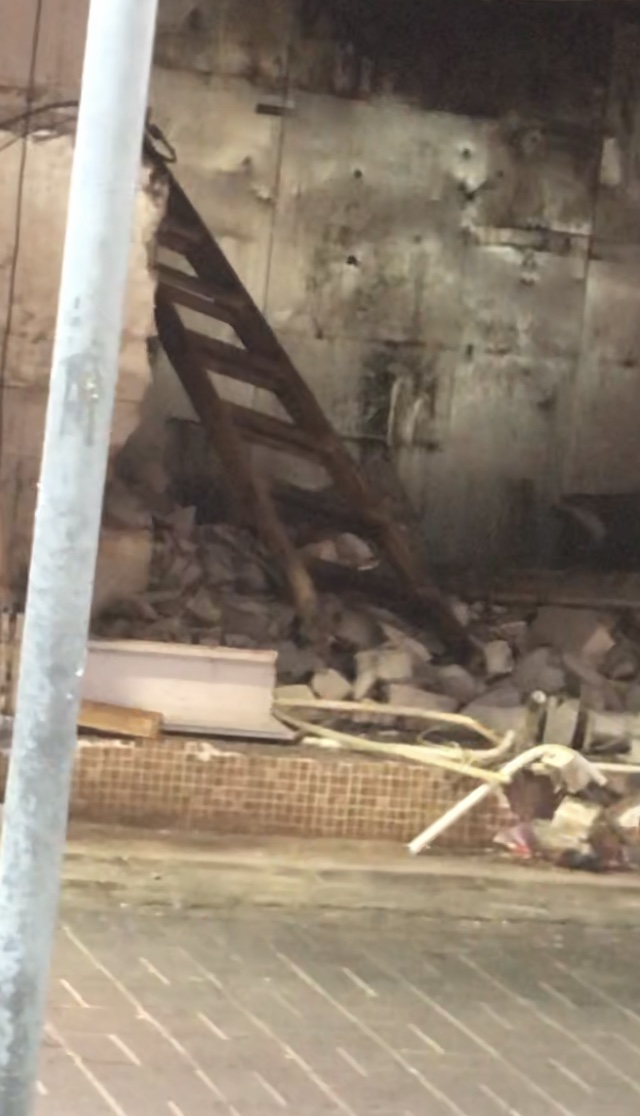

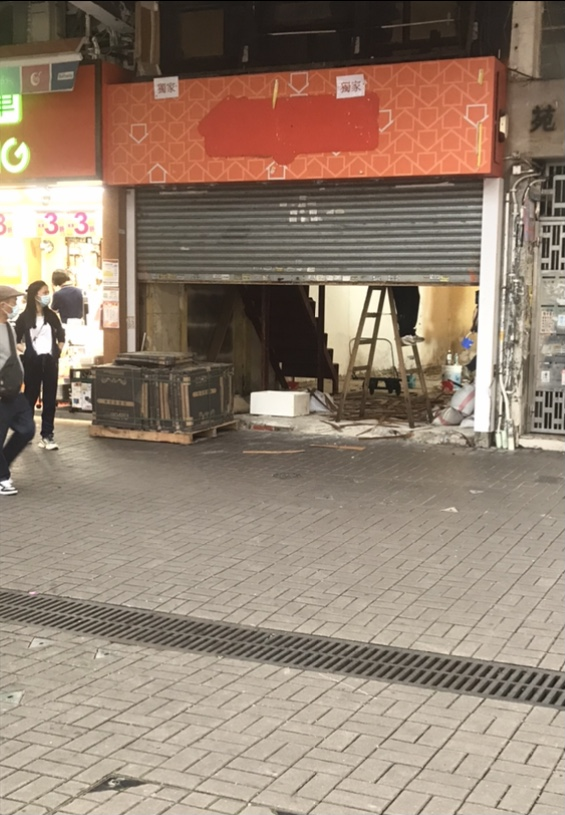

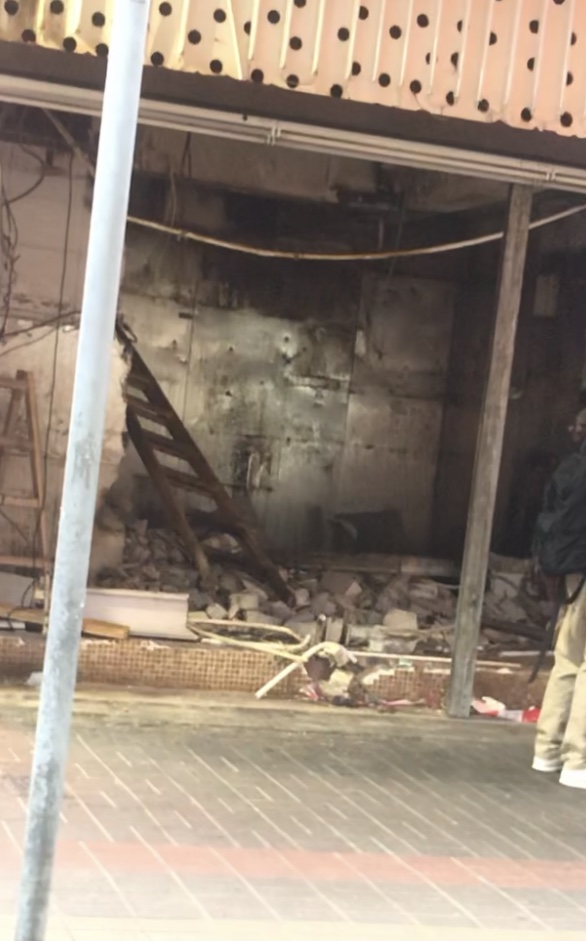

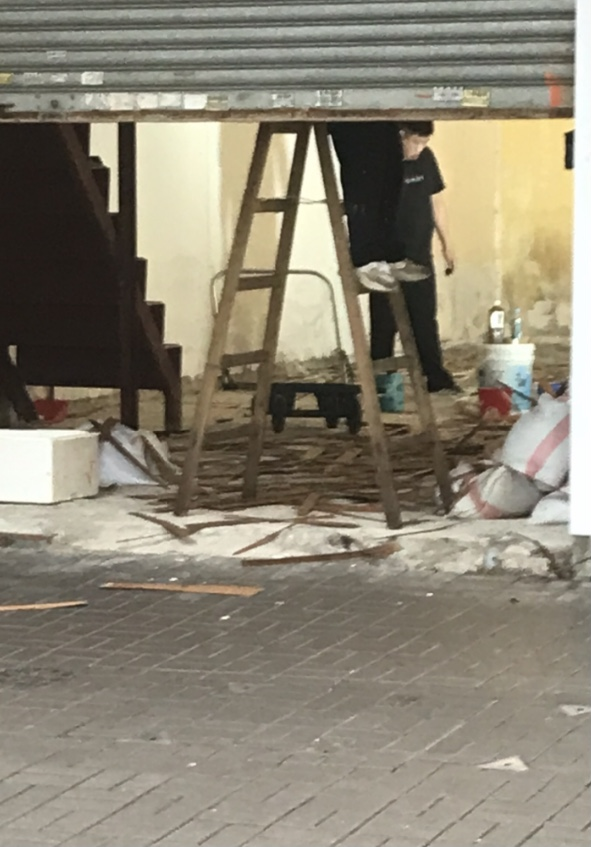

In the US, “About 75% of homes built before 1978 contain some lead-based paint. The older the home the more likely it is to contain lead-based paint. You should assume that any home built before 1978 contains some lead."

In April 2010 the U.S. Environmental Protection Agency (EPA) required that all renovators working in homes built before 1978 and disturbing more than 6 square feet (0.56 m^{2}) of lead paint inside the home or 20 square feet (1.9 m^{2}) outside the home be certified. EPA's Lead Renovation, Repair and Painting Rule (RRP Rule) lowers the risk of lead contamination from home renovation activities. It requires that firms performing renovation, repair, and painting projects that disturb lead-based paint in homes, child care facilities and pre-schools (any child occupied facility) built before 1978 be certified by EPA and use certified renovators who are trained by EPA-approved training providers to follow lead-safe work practices.

Careful stabilization of any deteriorated (peeling, chipping, cracking, etc.) paint in a lead-safe manner is also encouraged. Through authority vested in the United States Department of Housing and Urban Development (HUD), lead-based-paint removal by dry scraping, dry sanding, torching and burning, the use of heat guns over 1100 °F, and machine-sanding / grinding without a HEPA-filtered vacuum or a HEPA filtered dust collection system, is prohibited, as these methods have been proven to produce significant amount of lead dust during renovation, remodeling and painting.

At the end of any remodeling or repainting job, a dust test performed by an independent third-party professional is also required by HUD for "clearance". Lead evaluations are done using a method called X-Ray fluorescence (XRF), which gives a result in 4–8 seconds with a 95% accuracy at the 2-sigma level.

As of 2018, there are an estimated 37 million homes and apartments with lead paint in the United States.

=== Sustainability ===
Currently, worldwide 38% of emissions and 35% of energy use come from the building sector, including building construction and operation. This means renovations contribute to emissions and energy use of the building sector. These percentages are the largest portion of the total emissions and energy use globally. This makes buildings have the highest potential for decreasing these percentages as well as the largest need to decrease them. Renovations are also one way to do this.

Renovations decrease emissions as instead of demolishing a building just to build a new one the building is reused. Reuse of buildings is not always desirable as it is often pursued to have a building designed for the many individual and unique needs building owners have but it is not always a necessity. Renovations can take a building and make it completely different from the old building just reusing the structure, which is often the largest contributor of embodied carbon to a building. However, in order to be able to do this buildings need to be design durably and re-use. Designing for durability and reuse is designing for new buildings to be "long lasting, use-adaptable, and culturally valuable" to allow for the building to be kept for longer to minimize emissions from a complete rebuild.

Having these ideas in mind while designing new buildings significantly increases the likelihood for renovations to happen. Buildings are more likely to be torn down because they can not accommodate the new desired use then because the structure is failing. Renovations allow old buildings to fit new needs in a way that outputs less emissions than a complete tear down and construction of a new building which is often a feasible option.

=== Economic ===
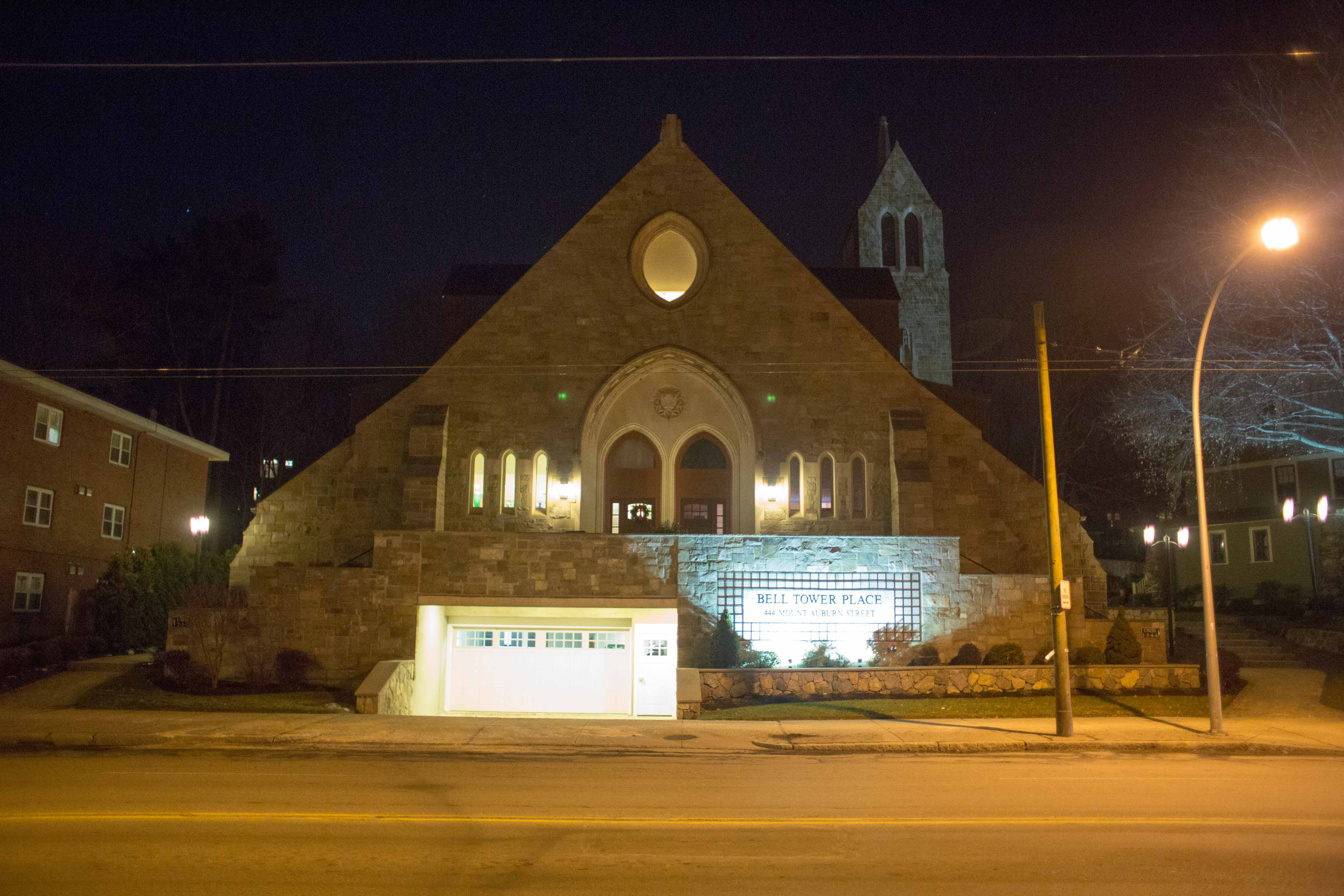
Renovated church, now condominiums, Watertown, Massachusetts

Renovation has several effects on economies, including:

- creating jobs
- increasing spending
- increasing property values
- generating tax revenue during both the construction and residential phases

== See also ==
- Solvent – Substance dissolving a solute resulting in a solution
  - Benzene – Hydrocarbon compound (C6H6)
  - Formaldehyde – Organic compound (H–CHO); simplest aldehyde; tissue preservation fluid
  - Trichloroethylene – C2HCl3, widely used industrial solvent
- Cancer – Group of diseases involving cell growth
- Concrete – Composite construction material
- Construction waste – Unwanted material produced directly or incidentally by the construction industries
- Do it yourself – Building, modifying, or repairing, without the aid of experts or professionals
- Home improvement – Process of renovating or making additions to one's home
- How Buildings Learn – 1994 book and TV series by Stewart Brand
- Indoor air quality – Air quality within and around buildings and structures
- Lead positioning – Poisoning caused by lead in the body
- Metal swarf – Filing debris or waste resulting from metal manufacturing processes
- Microplastics – Extremely small fragments of plastic
- Particulates – Microscopic solid or liquid matter suspended in the Earth's atmosphere
- Power tools – Tool that uses an additional power source
- Pollution – Adverse environmental contamination
- Repair Café – Venues where people gather and repair everyday items
- Sawdust – Byproduct or waste product of woodworking operations (sawing, sanding, milling, etc.)
- TVOC – Chemical with a high vapor pressure at room temperature
- Welding – Fabrication process for joining materials
- Wood glue – Adhesive used to bond wood and wood-based materials
- Wood preservative – Treatment or process aimed at extending the service life of wood structures
