= Structural repairs =

In construction, structural repairs is a technical term describing maintenance of a property structure in order to bring it up to local health and safety standards. It is contrasted to renovations or non-structural repairs. Unlike renovations, structural repairs add relatively little value to a property.

Leases often include provisions that define what types of changes amount to structural repairs and assign responsibility to either the tenant or the landlord.
